= World War II by country =

Allies before the attack on Pearl Harbor Allies that joined after the attack on Pearl Harbor or after 1942 Axis powers (not including occupied territory) Neutral powers

Map of the world during WWII (1940)

Almost every country in the world participated in World War II. Most were neutral at the beginning, but relatively few nations remained neutral to the end. World War II pitted two alliances of nations against each other, the Allies and the Axis powers. Estimates of death toll range from 40 to 90 million people (including all genocide casualties). The main Axis powers were Nazi Germany, the Empire of Japan, and the Kingdom of Italy; while the United Kingdom, the United States, the Soviet Union, and China were the "Big Four" Allied powers.

The countries which were either involved in or affected by World War II are listed alphabetically, along with a description of the role which they played in the conflict.

== Participants and non-participants during World War II ==
=== Neutral powers ===
- North Yemen
- Switzerland
- Tibet
- Spain
- Afghanistan
- Sweden
- Vatican City
- Bhutan
- Ireland
- Portugal
- Estonia (from 1939–1941)
- Lithuania (from 1939–1941)
- Latvia (from 1939–1941)
- Liechtenstein
- Argentina
- Peru (until 1945)
- Venezuela (until 1945)
- Ecuador (until 1945)
- Uruguay (until 1945)
- Paraguay (until 1945)
- United States (until 1941)

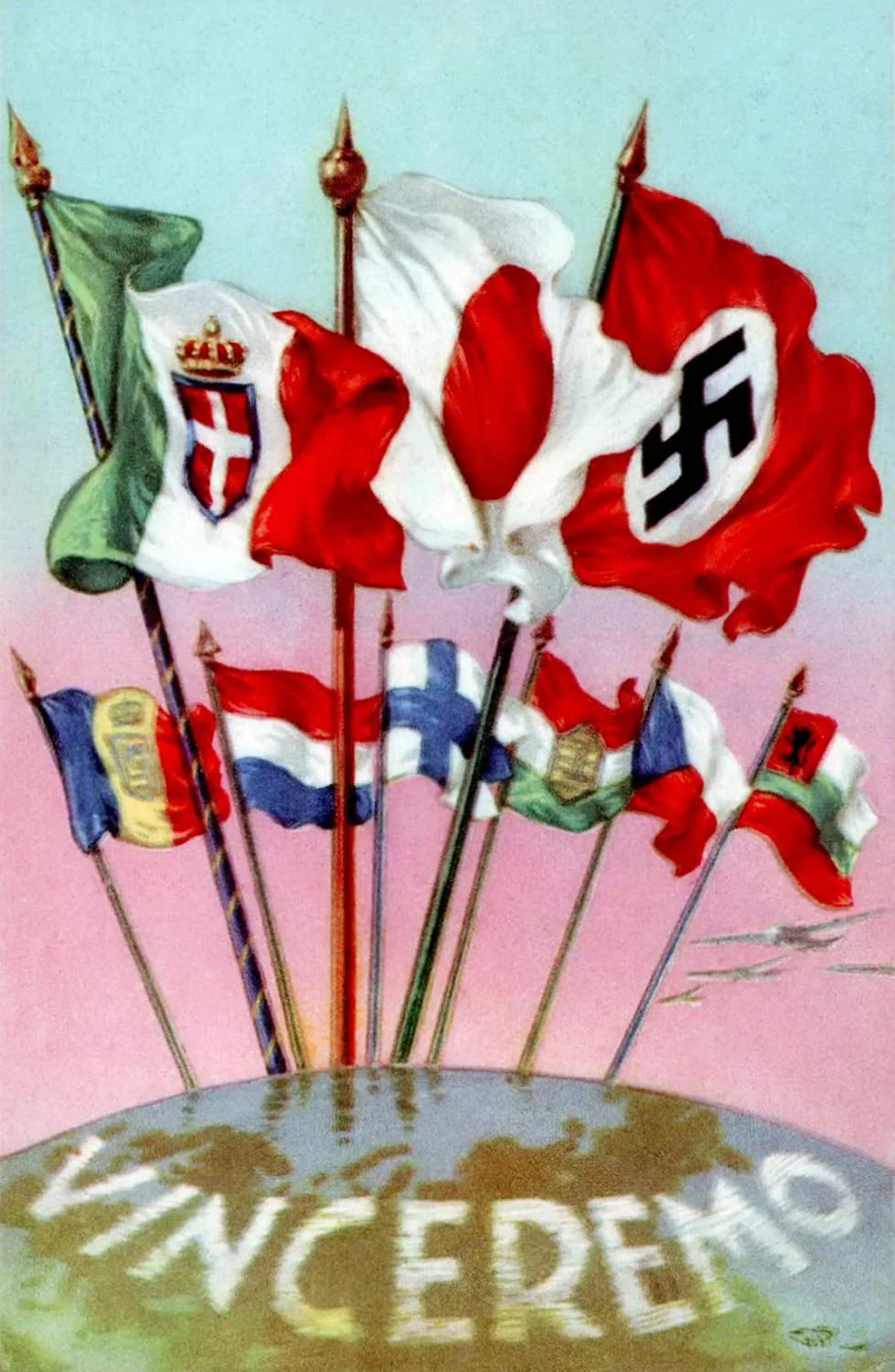
An axis powers flags poster

=== Axis powers ===
- Germany (from 1939–1945)
- Italy (from 1940–1943)
- Japan (from 1940–1945)
- Hungary (from 1940–1944)
- Hungary (GONU) (from 1944)
- Romania (from 1940–1944)
- Bulgaria (from 1941–1944)
- Slovakia (from 1939–1945)
- Croatia (from 1941)
- Philippines (from 1943)
- North Italy (from 1943)
- Thailand (from 1941)
- Iraq (1941)
- Bohemia and Moravia
- Italian Albania (from 1940–1943)
- Finland (from 1941–1944)
- Vichy France (nominally neutral, officially known as the "French State") (from 1940–1944)
- French Indochina (de facto Japanese occupation post 1944)
- French Indochina of Japan (1945)
  - Vietnam
  - Luang Prabang
  - Kampuchea
- Dutch East Indies of Japan (from 1942–1945)
- Serbia (officially known as the "Government of National Salvation") (from 1941–1944)
- Lokot Autonomy (from 1941–1944)
- Montenegro (from 1941–1944)
- Belarus (from 1941–1944)
- German Albania (from 1943–1944)
- Hellenic State (from 1941–1944)
- Norwegian State (from 1942–1945)
- Kosakenland (from 1944)
- Yugoslavia (1941) (2 days)
- Chetniks (1941–1945)
- Burma (from 1942–1945)
- Macedonia (1944) (A proposed puppet state of Germany in Macedonia)
- Azad Hind (from 1943)
- Manchukuo
- Mengjiang
- Wang Jingwei regime (from 1940)
- Iran (co-belligerent)
- Reichskommissariat Ukraine (from 1941)
- (Estonia) Reichskommissariat Ostland (from 1941-1943)
- (Netherlands) Reichskommissariat Niederlande (from 1940-1944)

=== Allied powers ===
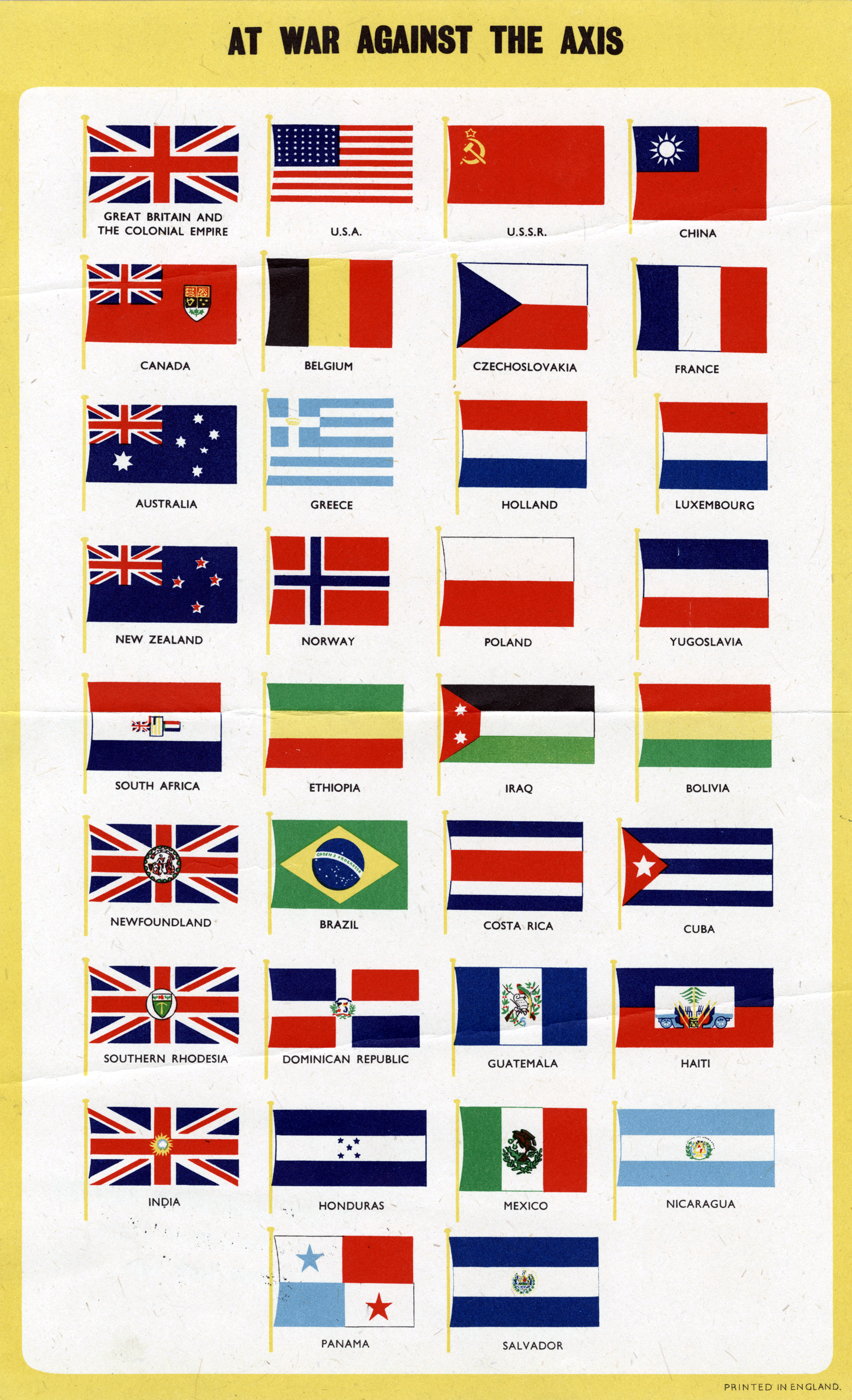
A flags poster of the allied nations

- United Kingdom (from 1939)
- United States (from 1941)
- Soviet Union (from 1941)
- China
- France (until 1940)
- Poland
- Mongolia (1945)
- Czechoslovakia (from 1939)
- Nepal
- Saudi Arabia (1945)
- Philippines (from 1941)
- Canada (from 1939)
- Newfoundland
- India
- Australia
- Poland (from 1939)
- Free France (from 1940–1944)
- New Zealand
- San Marino (1944)
- Southern Rhodesia
- Mexico (from 1942)
- Dominican Republic (from 1941)
- Belgium (from 1940)
- Netherlands (from 1940)
- Luxembourg (from 1940)
- Norway (from 1940)
- Brazil (from 1942)
- Liberia (from 1944)
- Korea
- Egypt
- Haiti (from 1941)
- South Africa
- Finland (from 1944)
- Iraq (from 1943)
- Italy (from 1943)
- Italian resistance movement (1943–1945)
- Romania (from 1944)
- Bulgaria (from 1944)
- Yugoslavia (1941)
- Turkey (1945)
- Greece (from 1940)
- Syria (1945)
- Lebanon (1945)
- Muscat and Oman
- Iran (from 1941)
- Ethiopia (from 1941)
- Denmark (1940)
- LANÇ (1942-1945)
- Cuba (from 1941)
- Panama (from 1941)
- Costa Rica (from 1941)
- Tuva (from 1941-1944)
- Việt Minh (from 1941)
- Yugoslavia (from 1941)
- (United Kingdom) (Kingdom of Egypt) Anglo-Egyptian Sudan
- Provisional Government of the French Republic (from 1944)
- Belgian Congo (from 1940)

== Afghanistan ==
Under Prime Minister Mohammad Hashim Khan, Afghanistan stayed neutral. Despite British pressure, Afghanistan maintained friendly relations with the Axis during the war, in the hopes that the Axis would help stop British influence in the region, which came from the British Raj and Mesopotamia. In 1940, the Afghanistan legation in Berlin asked whether Germany would cede land in British Raj to Afghanistan if it should win the war; specifically, the king and minister wanted to acquire all the ethnic Pashtun land between the Durand Line and the Indus River. Despite this stated goal, Afghanistan stayed out of the war, neither suffering an attack nor attacking any other country.

In 1941, Western press reported that Amanullah Khan, a former king who lost his throne in a civil war in the 1920s, was working as an agent for Nazi Germany in Berlin. It is believed he was involved in plans to regain his throne with Axis help. Following the Axis loss in Stalingrad in 1943, the plans cooled off and were never executed.

== Albania ==
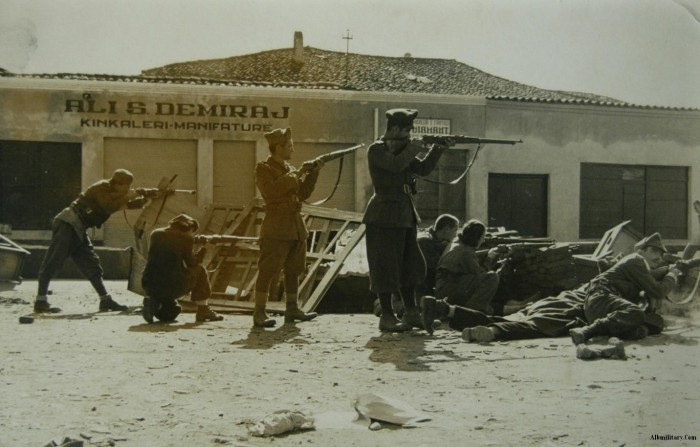
Albanian partisans fighting against the Germans

After the Italian invasion of Albania in April 1939, 100,000 Italian soldiers and 11,000 Italian colonists who wanted to integrate Albania into the Italian Empire settled in the country. Initially the Albanian Fascist Party received support from the population, mainly because of the unification of Kosovo and other Albanian-populated territories with Albania proper after the conquest of Yugoslavia and Greece by the Axis in Spring 1941. Benito Mussolini boasted in May 1941 to a group of Albanian fascists that he had achieved the Greater Albania long wanted by the Tirana nationalists. On June 22, 1941, Germany launched Operation Barbarossa and on June 28 Albania also declared war on the USSR.

In October 1941, small Albanian Communist groups established an Albanian Communist Party in Tirana of 130 members under the leadership of Enver Hoxha. In mid-1942, however, party leaders increased their popularity by calling young people to fight for the liberation of their country from Italy. In September 1942, the party organized the Albanian National Anti-Fascist Front, from a number of resistance groups, including several that were strongly anti-communist. They assembled a National Liberation Army.

Germany occupied Albania in September 1943, dropping paratroopers into Tirana before the Albanian guerrillas could take the capital, and soon drove the guerrillas into the hills and to the south. Berlin subsequently announced it would recognize the independence of a neutral Albania and organized an Albanian government, police, and military. Many Balli Kombëtar units and leaders collaborated. The partisans entirely liberated Albania from German occupation on November 29, 1944. The Albanian partisans also helped in the liberation of Kosovo and parts of Yugoslavia.

== Algeria ==
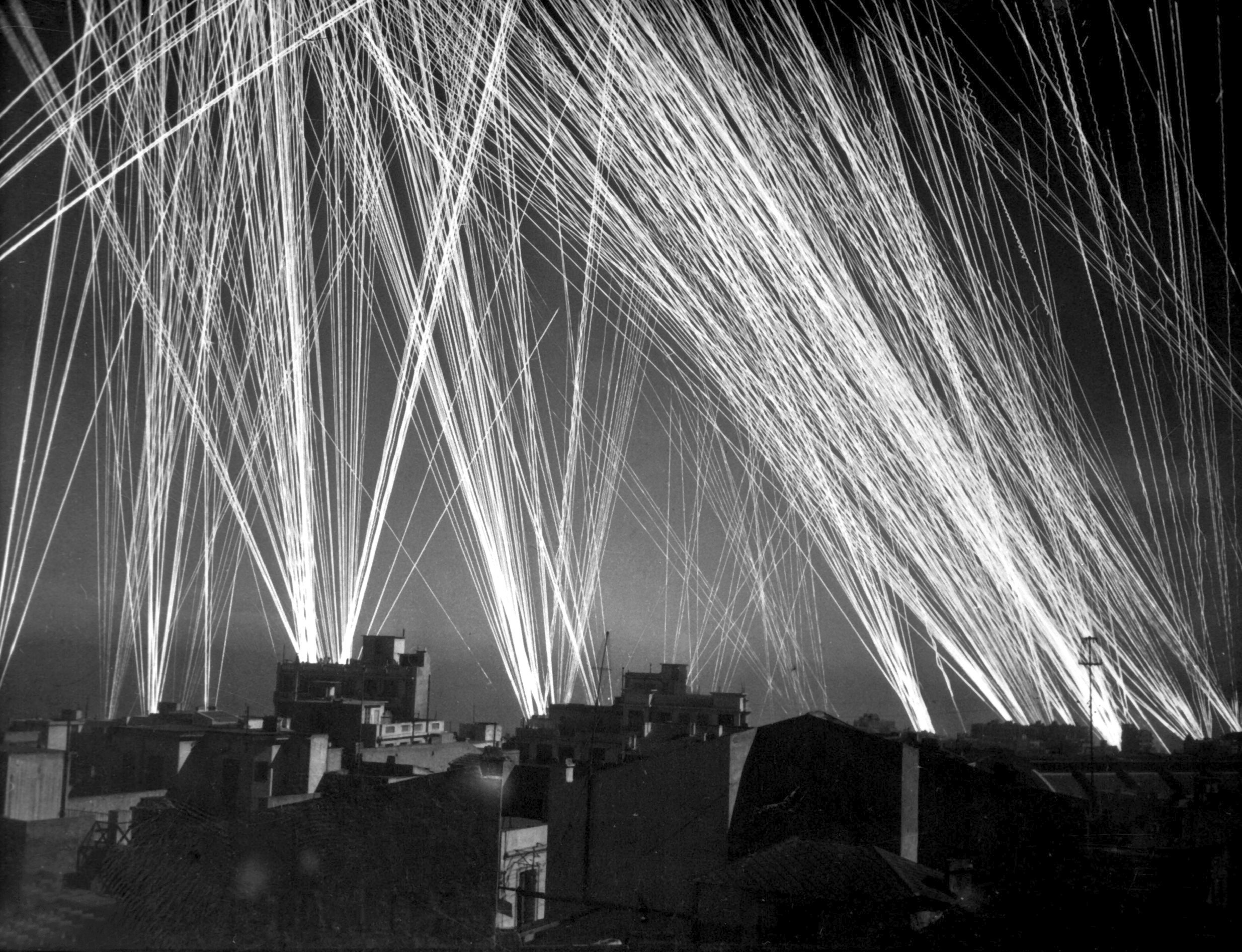
Anti-aircraft fire during a German air raid on Free French-held Algiers, 1943

After the Fall of France, Algeria, along with France's other possessions in Africa, were under the control of Nazi Germany and Vichy France. Next, the British Empire launched a squadron of the Royal Navy to attack the port of Mers-El-Kébir, near Oran because it was full of French warships. On November 8, 1942, the Allies launched a major offensive codenamed Operation Torch. Afterwards, the Italians bombed Algiers. Then, the Allies attempted to capture the cities of Oran and Algiers by naval landing but the French troops and navy were in large quantity. So, they first took Morocco and then Algeria along the way, establishing the liberation of northern Africa.

During the War, large numbers of both Muslim and European Algerians served with the French Army. Algerian troops particularly distinguished themselves in the French Expeditionary Corps under General Juin during the Italian campaign of 1943 and in Operation Dragoon, the Allied invasion of southern France in 1944.

== Andorra ==
Andorra remained politically neutral throughout the war but was used as a smuggling route by Axis Vichy French and Axis-aligned Spanish personnel.

== Anglo-Egyptian Sudan ==
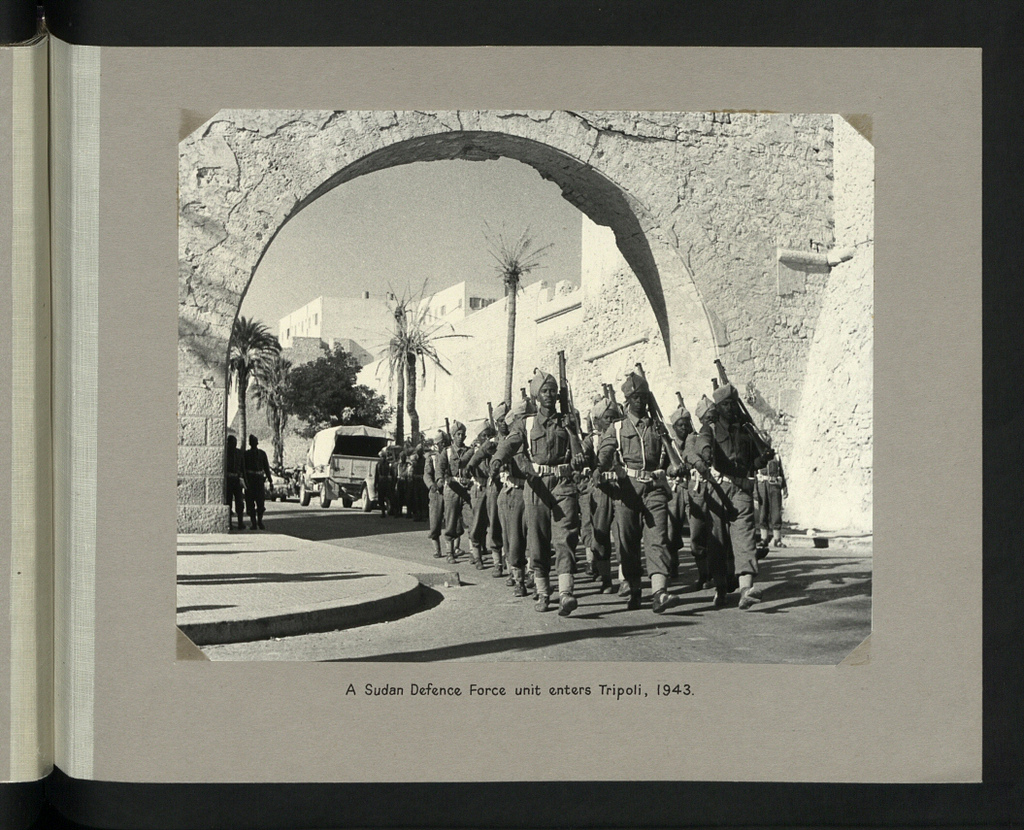
SDF forces enter Piazza Italia after the capture of Tripoli, 1943.

The condominium of Anglo-Egyptian Sudan was at war from the time of the United Kingdom's declaration in 1939. Fighting reached Sudan in 1940 when Italy entered the war. Sudan had a long border with Italian East Africa and therefore became the Northern Front in the East African campaign. Italian forces captured the railway junction at Kassala and other towns and raided as far north as Port Sudan. Units of the Sudan Defence Force (SDF) were combined with the Indian 1st Horse to form Gazelle Force, which helped drive the Italian forces out of Sudanese territory in January 1941.

Another SDF battalion was part of Gideon Force, which invaded Ethiopia, while others took part in the invasion of Eritrea. The SDF took part in the Western Desert campaign along the northern Sudanese border with Libya, supplying the Free French and then the Long Range Desert Group stationed there.

== Antarctica ==
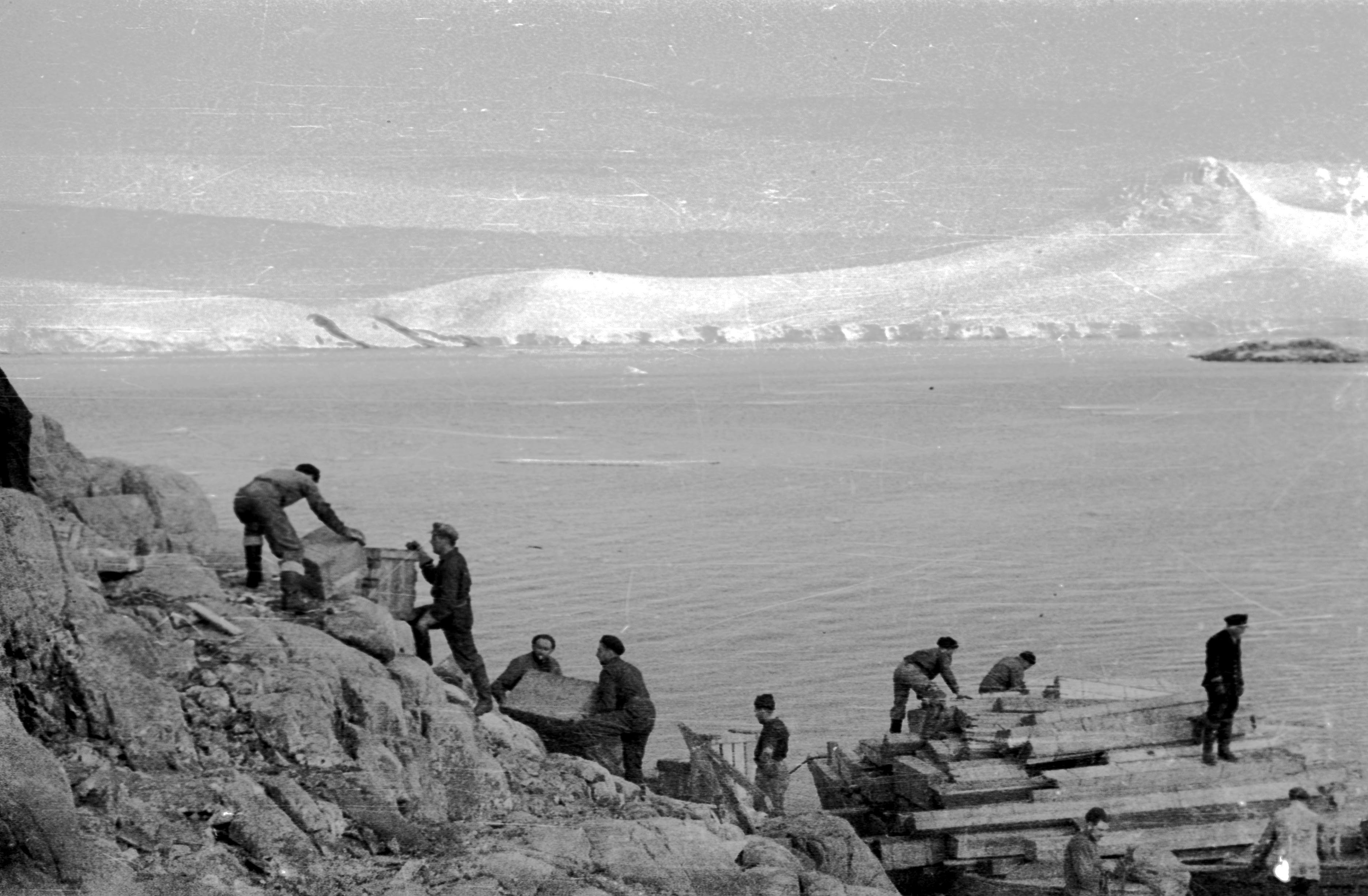
Personnel of Operation Tabarin unload supplies at Port Lockroy, 1944.

International competition extended to the continent of Antarctica during the World War II era, though the region saw no combat. During the prelude to war, Nazi Germany organised the 1938 Third German Antarctic Expedition to preempt Norway's claim to Queen Maud Land. The expedition served as the basis for a new German claim, called New Swabia. A year later, the United States Antarctic Service Expedition established two bases, which operated for two years before being abandoned. Responding to these encroachments, and taking advantage of Europe's wartime turmoil, the nearby nations of Chile and Argentina made their own claims. In 1940 Chile proclaimed the Chilean Antarctic Territory in areas already claimed by Britain, while Argentina (who already had a permanent establishment since 1904) proclaimed Argentine Antarctica in 1943 in an overlapping area.

In response to the activities of Germany, Chile, Argentina, and the United States, Britain launched Operation Tabarin in 1943. Its objective was to establish a permanent presence and assert Britain's claim to the Falkland Islands Dependencies, as well as to deny use of the area to the Kriegsmarine, which was known to use remote islands as rendezvous points. There was also a fear that Japan might attempt to seize the Falkland Islands. The expedition under Lieutenant James Marr left the Falklands on 29 January 1944. Bases were established on Deception Island, the coast of Graham Land, and at Hope Bay. The research begun by Operation Tabarin continued in subsequent years, ultimately becoming the British Antarctic Survey.

In the postwar period, competition continued among Antarctica's claimant powers, as well as the United States and Soviet Union. In the late 1950s, this competition would give way to a cooperative international framework with the International Geophysical Year and the Antarctic Treaty.

== Argentina ==
Before the start of World War II in 1939, Argentina had maintained a long tradition of neutrality regarding European wars, which had been upheld and defended by all major political parties since the 19th century. One of the main reasons for this policy was related to Argentina's economic position as one of the world's leading exporters of foodstuffs and agricultural products, to Europe in general and to the United Kingdom in particular. Thus, initially, even though the government of Argentina was sympathetic to the Allies and provided economic assistance to the United Kingdom, the country's political tradition of neutralism prevailed. Following the Japanese attack on Pearl Harbor and the subsequent American declaration of war upon Japan, American pressure for Argentine entry into the war begun to increase. Relations worsened further following a military coup in 1943, as the plotters were accused of holding Axis sympathies. Because of strong divisions and internal disputes between members of the Argentine military, the country would continue to remain neutral, even after American sanctions. However, Argentina eventually gave in to the Allies' pressure, broke relations with the Axis powers on January 26, 1944, and declared war on March 27, 1945. Over 4,000 Argentine volunteers fought on the Allied side. Beginning in the late stages of the war and continuing for some years after, the Ratlines were systems of escape routes for German Nazis and other fascists fleeing Europe. Argentina, with the clandestine support and encouragement of Juan Perón and his government, was the principal destination of these escape routes and became a haven for thousands of people associated with the Hitler regime.

== Australia ==
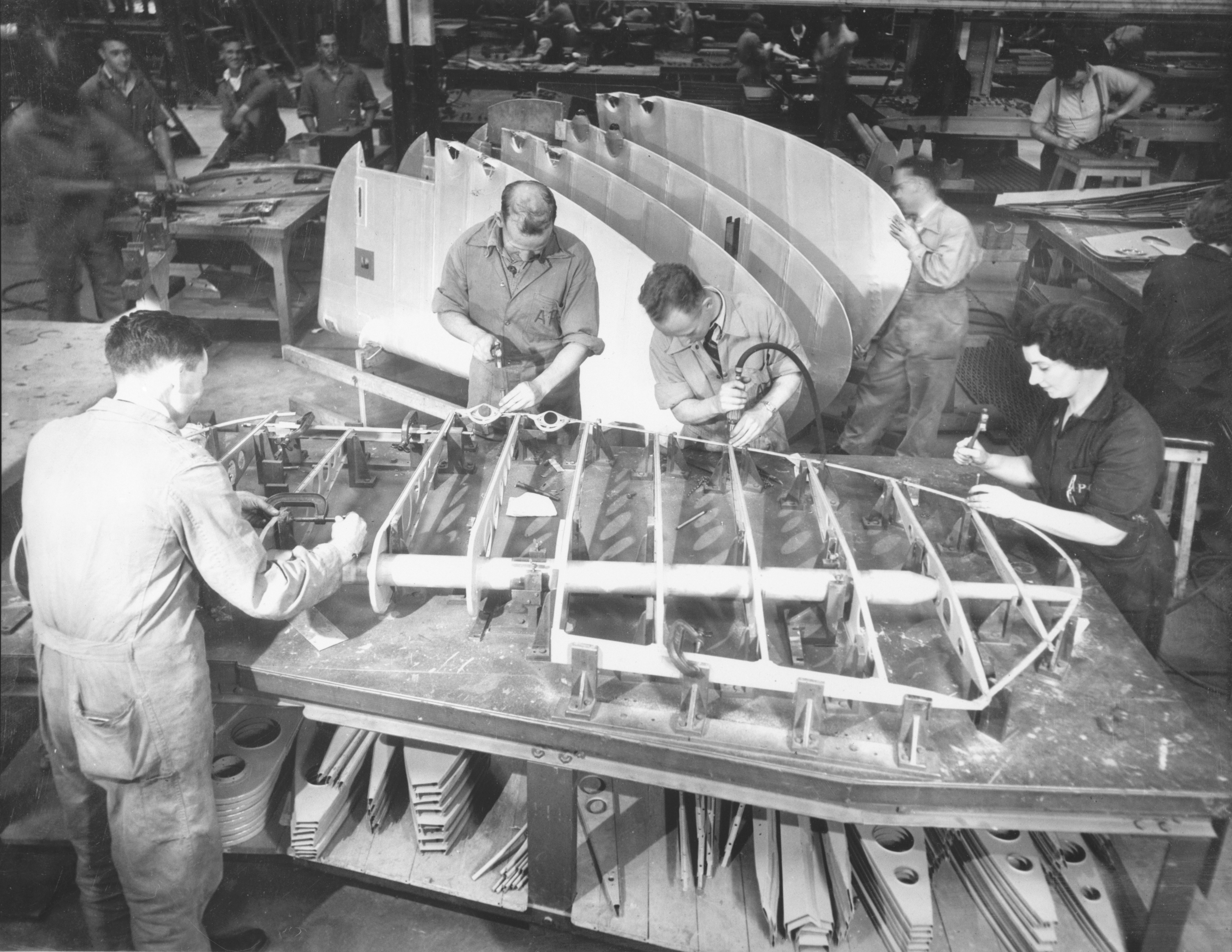
Workers assemble rudders for Bristol Beaufort bombers in Melbourne, 1943.

Australia was among the first countries to announce it was at war with Germany, on 3 September 1939. The Prime Minister, Robert Menzies, considered that the British declaration legally bound Australia, and he announced a state of war between Australia and Germany as a direct consequence of the British declaration.

More than one million Australian men served in the war out of a total population of around seven million. Although it was ill-prepared for war, the Australian government soon dispatched squadrons and personnel to serve with the Royal Air Force. The Royal Australian Navy (RAN) commenced operations against Italy in June 1940. Later that year the Australian Army entered the North Africa campaign and fought in Greece. German submarines and raiding ships operated in Australian waters throughout the war. After the outbreak of hostilities with Japan in late 1941, Japanese aircraft launched a bombing attack on Darwin in February, and smaller air raids on Australia, 1942–43.

For the remainder of the war, the Australian war effort was concentrated in south-east Asia and the South West Pacific Area: they were involved from January 1942 in Malaya, the Dutch East Indies and the Australian territory of New Guinea. During mid-1942 Militia troops fought the Kokoda Track campaign, and the New Guinea campaign came to occupy the attention of most of the Australian armed forces until 1945.

=== Papua and New Guinea ===
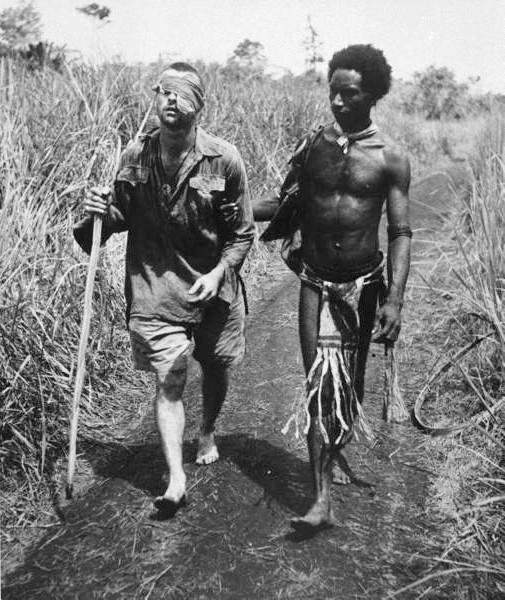
An Australian soldier is aided by a Papuan orderly near Buna in December 1942.

What is now Papua New Guinea consisted of two territories under Australian administration, the Territories of Papua and New Guinea. Upon the outbreak of the Second World War, the New Guinea Volunteer Rifles were organized as a militia unit of white expatriates in the New Guinea territory, while the bulk of the Australian military was deployed in the Mediterranean. Japanese forces invaded beginning in January 1942 with the Battle of Rabaul; in the following months Japan occupied most of the Territory of New Guinea. From late 1942 until the Japanese surrender, the Allies, mostly Australian and US forces, cleared the Japanese first from Papua, then the Territory of New Guinea, and finally from Dutch West New Guinea. The campaign resulted in heavy losses for Japan. Disease and starvation claimed more Japanese lives than combat. Allied forces effectively besieged enemy garrisons, cutting them off from food and medical supplies.

During the war, civil administration in both territories ceased and the whole area was placed under martial law. Only a single battalion, the Papuan Infantry Battalion, was ever recruited from the native Papuan population. Many other people were recruited to bring supplies up to the front and carry injured Australian troops: the so-called Fuzzy Wuzzy Angels. Civil government was restored after the war, and in 1949 the two territories were united as the Territory of Papua and New Guinea.

== Bahamas ==
As part of the Destroyers for Bases Agreement of 1940, the United States Navy established a base and airstrip at George Town on Great Exuma. Some Bahamians enlisted in the Caribbean Regiment and other British units.

The Duke of Windsor, the former King Edward VIII, was installed as Governor of the Bahamas in August 1940. It is widely believed that the Duke and Duchess sympathised with fascism before and during the war, and were moved to the Bahamas to minimise their opportunities to act on those feelings. The Duke was praised for his efforts to combat poverty on the islands, although he was as contemptuous of the Bahamians as he was of most non-white peoples of the Empire. He was also praised for his resolution of civil unrest over low wages in Nassau in June 1942, when there was a "full-scale riot", even though he blamed the trouble on "mischief makers – communists" and "men of Central European Jewish descent". The Duke resigned the post on 16 March 1945. In April 1942 the United Kingdom asked Canada to provide military support in Nassau, in part to protect the Duke. A company of the Veterans Guard of Canada served in the Bahamas, followed by a company of the Pictou Highlanders. The Canadian garrison left Nassau in 1946

== Bahrain ==
The Sheikh of Bahrain declared war on Germany on September 10, 1939. On October 19, 1940, four Italian planes bombed Bahrain to destroy oil refineries supplying the Allies. The raid caused minimal damage to the oil refineries but made the Allies increase the defense around Bahrain (being a UK protectorate).

== Belgium ==
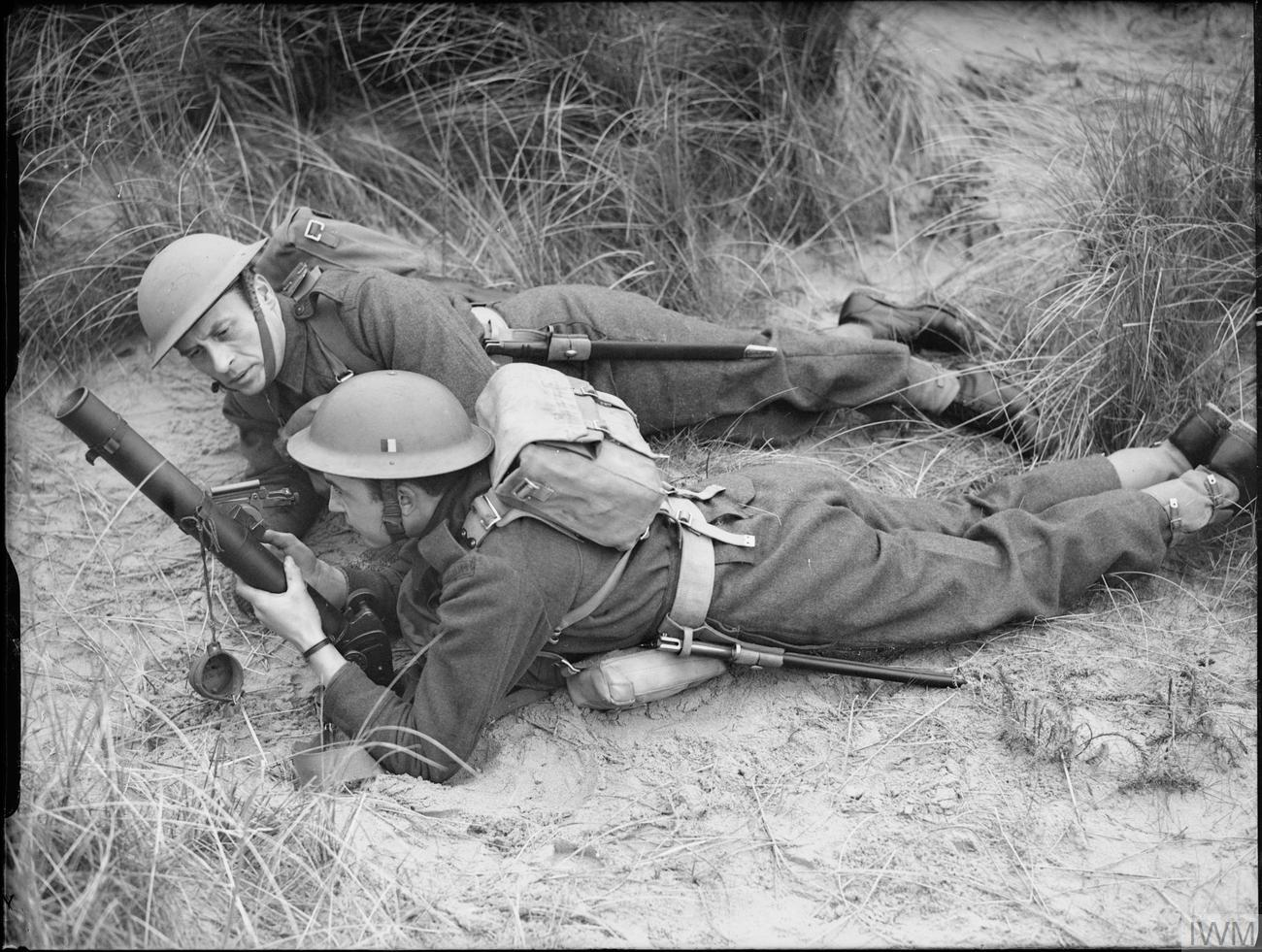
Free Belgian soldiers training in Wales, 1942

In 1936, Belgium had declared its neutrality in the event of war in Europe. Nevertheless, in May 1940, Germany launched a surprise attack during its wider blitzkrieg against France. Belgian forces resisted the invasion in the Battle of Belgium for 18 days, but the Belgian army and its commander, King Leopold III, surrendered on 28 May 1940. A few Belgian soldiers escaped via Dunkirk, but the King and most of the army were made prisoners of war. Many remained imprisoned until the end of World War II.

Germany occupied Belgium and installed a military government. The occupiers imposed harsh taxes and strict rationing. Hundreds of thousands of Belgians laboured in Germany during the war, most as part of Germany's forced labour programme. Around 25,000 Jews and Romani were deported during the Holocaust in Belgium, most passing through the Mechelen transit camp. Nearly all lost their lives in the Nazi death camps. A number of Nazi collaborationist groups operated in Flanders and Wallonia; other Belgians collaborated through the national administration and the Flemish and Walloon Legions of the Waffen-SS. In opposition, the Belgian Resistance comprised numerous groups that fought against the occupation in various ways. Groupe G ran a successful campaign of sabotage against railroads, while other groups worked to protect Jewish people from deportation or help downed Allied airmen escape from the country.

Belgium's elected government fled the occupation, relocating to France and then London, where it established the Belgian government in exile under Hubert Pierlot and the Free Belgian Forces under Victor van Strydonck de Burkel. Belgian forces participated in the D-Day campaign, the Italian campaign, the landings on Walcheren Island, and the Battle of the Atlantic. Britain and the United States targeted occupied Belgium with strategic bombing, which caused many civilian casualties. The Liberation of Belgium began in September 1944 when Allied forces, including Free Belgians, entered the country. German troops counterattacked in December with the Ardennes Offensive; the failure of that offensive forced all German troops out of Belgium by February 1945. German V-bomb attacks continued until the end of the war.

Post-war Belgium joined NATO and the Benelux customs union, while accusations of collaboration by King Leopold sparked the political crisis called the Royal Question.

=== Belgian Congo ===
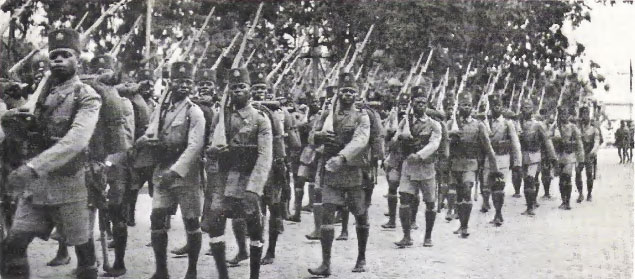
Force Publique soldiers leaving the Congo for the East African campaign

The Belgian Colonial Empire stayed loyal to the Allies: after Belgium's surrender, both the Belgian Congo and Ruanda-Urundi remained under the authority of the Belgian government in exile and the Free Belgian Forces. The Congo played an important role as an economic asset, producing large amounts of raw materials for the Allies, notably gold and uranium. The nuclear bombs dropped on Hiroshima and Nagasaki were made with uranium from Congolese mines. Congolese troops also fought as the Force Publique, which saw combat against Italian forces in the East African campaign. Medical troops were also brought on the east-Asian front.

The colonial government's demands on the Congolese population provoked strikes, riots and other forms of resistance. These were repressed, often violently, by the colonial authorities. The Congo's comparative prosperity during the conflict led to a wave of post-war immigration from Belgium, bringing the white population to 100,000 by 1950, as well as a period of industrialisation and urbanisation that continued throughout the 1950s.

=== Ruanda-Urundi ===
Belgium's mandate of Ruanda-Urundi consisted of the modern nations of Rwanda and Burundi. There, the war years were marked by the Ruzagayura famine. Though initially caused by a drought, the famine's effects were made worse by the Belgian war effort as authorities tried to send agricultural produce to the Congo to support the Allies. The famine killed between a fifth and a third of the colony's population and displaced many thousands more.

== Bhutan ==
Although Bhutan was under British suzerainty, it remained independent; and it remained under the reign of Jigme Wangchuck the kingdom continued to maintain almost complete isolation from the outside world with only limited relations with the British Raj in India. Despite his policy of neutrality, upon the outbreak of the war, the king sent the government of India a gift of 100,000 rupees as a gesture of friendship.

== Bolivia ==
Bolivia was one of many South American countries to declare war on Germany later on in the war, joining the Allies on 7 April 1943. It was one of the three countries to declare war in 1943, the others being Chile and Colombia. Shortly after war was declared, the President of Bolivia, Enrique Peñaranda, was overthrown in a coup. The new ruler, Gualberto Villarroel, had fascist and anti-Semitic leanings, but foreign pressure compelled him to remain at peace and to suppress his more extreme pro-Nazi supporters. Bolivian mines supplied needed tin to the Allies, but with no coastline, the landlocked country did not send troops or warplanes overseas.

== Brazil ==
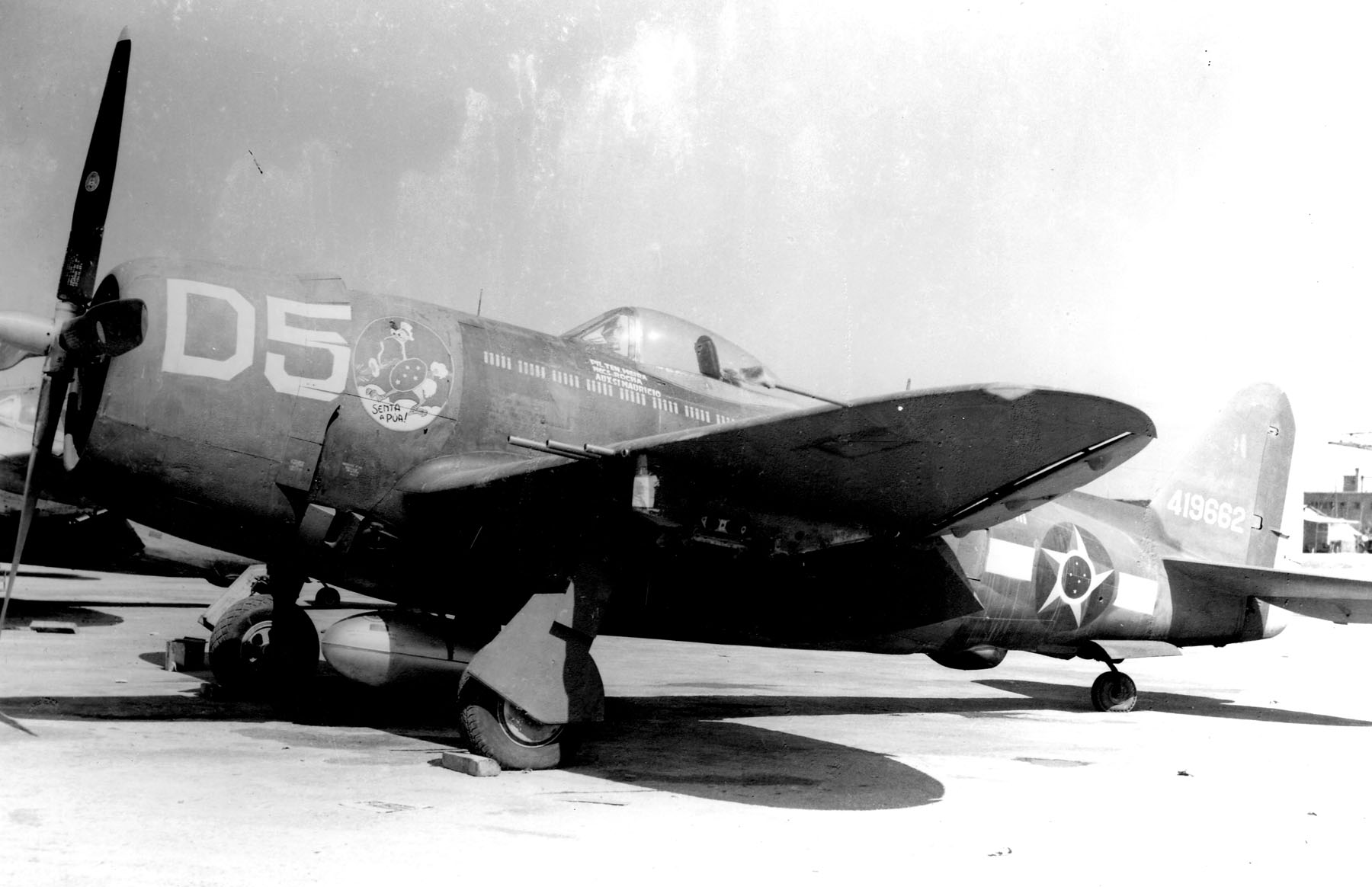
P-47s carried the "Senta a Pua!" emblem as nose art along with the national insignia of Brazil

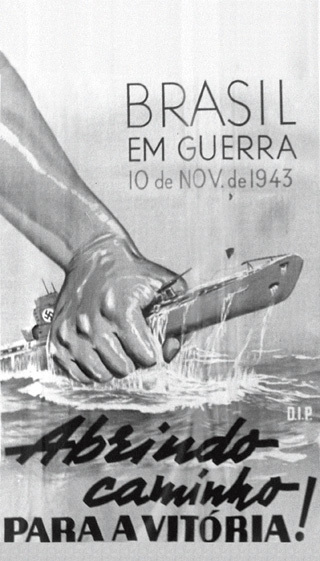
Brazilian poster announcing the declaration of war, November 10, 1943

Brazil was under its second civilian-military dictatorship led by Getúlio Vargas, maintaining its official neutrality until 1941, when it allowed US forces to use bases to patrol the South Atlantic. The United States built several airfields on Brazilian soil with the understanding that shortly after the war ended, they would be turned over to Brazil. In the wake of the Japanese attack on Pearl Harbor and the declarations of war of Nazi Germany and Fascist Italy against the US, in January 1942 at the 9th Pan-American Conference held in Rio de Janeiro, Brazil helped to influence other American countries to cut diplomatic relations with Axis Powers. In retaliation, Germany and Italy extended their submarine warfare against them. In the first half of 1942, Axis submarines sank Brazilian merchant ships, and Brazilian naval forces chased and attacked these submarines. When seven merchant ships were sunk by the German Submarine U-507, Vargas decided to make official the state of war against Germany and Italy.

Northeastern Brazil hosted at Natal the largest single American air base outside of its own territory, and at Recife, the U.S. 4th Fleet Headquarter under Admiral Ingram's command. The air base in Natal gave support to the North Africa campaign, and a route for USAAF airplanes to fly to India and China.

Brazilian naval forces in the Battle of the Atlantic helped US and British Navies to patrol the South and Central Atlantic Ocean, combating Axis U-boats and raiders. In 1943, Allied naval forces sunk most of the Axis submarines which were active in the West of the South Atlantic, the U-199 among them. After this intense campaign, the South Atlantic became a lost battle to Germany.

After two years of preparation, a complete infantry Division (about 25,000 troops, called the Brazilian Expeditionary Force (BEF)) was sent in July 1944 to fight in the Italian campaign. They fought in the last two stages of the Italian campaign: the slow breakdown of the Gothic Line and the final Allied offensive in that front.

== British Borneo ==
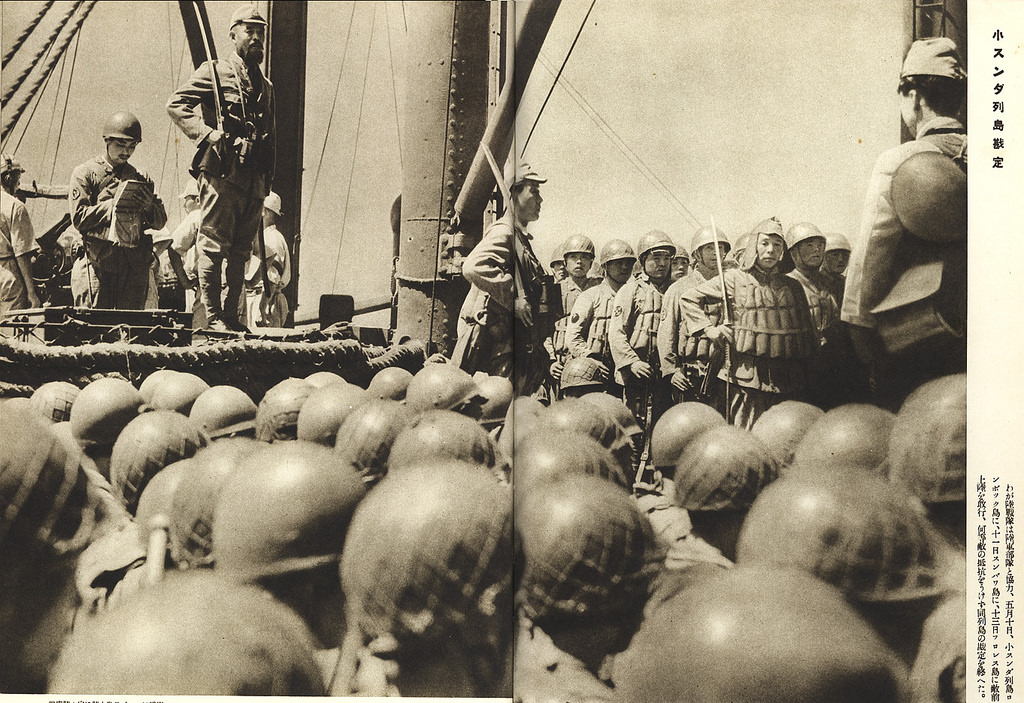
Japanese paratroopers on a transport to Borneo, December 1941

Borneo was divided into five territories: four in the north under the British – Sarawak, Brunei, Labuan island, and British North Borneo – and the remainder and bulk of the island to the south under the jurisdiction of the Dutch East Indies (now Indonesia).

The Japanese invasion plan called for the British territories to be taken and held by the Imperial Japanese Army and the southern Dutch territory to be taken and held by the Imperial Japanese Navy. On 8 December 1941, the Brooke government instructed that the oilfields at Miri and Seria and refinery at Lutong be quickly demolished. At dawn on 16 December, two Japanese landing units secured Miri and Seria with little resistance from British forces. A few hours later, Lutong was captured.

== Bulgaria ==
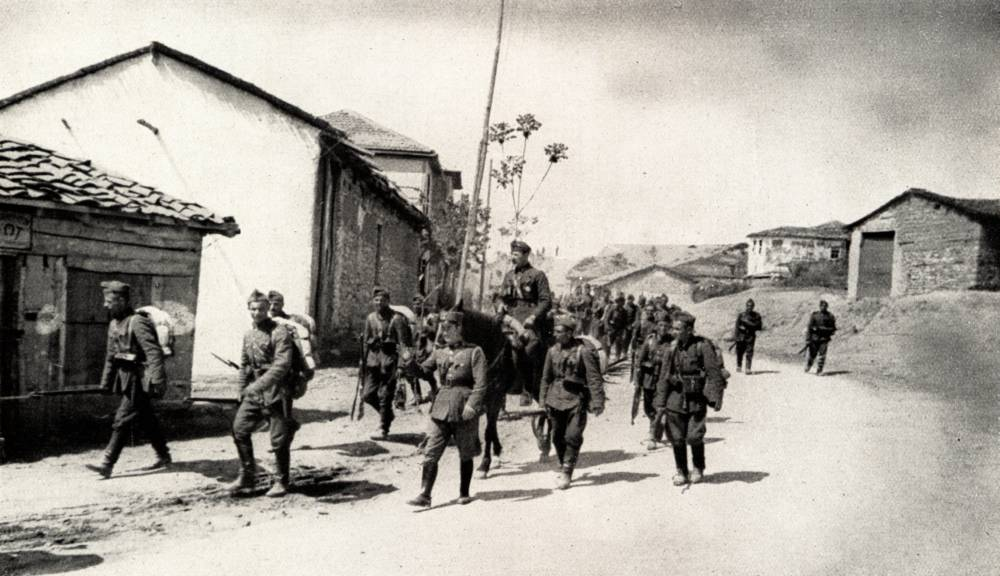
Bulgarian soldiers enter a village in northern Greece, April 1941.

Bulgaria gave up neutrality and became a German ally, signing the Tripartite Pact on 1 March 1941. Their main contribution was transit rights for German units involved against Yugoslavia and Greece. Bulgaria occupied portions of Greece and Yugoslavia to recreate the 19th-century boundaries of Greater Bulgaria, but it did not participate in the Invasion of the Soviet Union.

After the Communist-dominated Bulgarian coup d'état of 1944 of 9 September, the Bulgarian government declared war on Germany. Bulgarian armies attacked the German positions in Yugoslavia. An armistice was signed with the Allies in Moscow on 28 October 1944. After the Nazis fled Yugoslav territory, the Bulgarian Army continued its offensive in Hungary and Austria. Bulgaria's participation in World War II ended when its soldiers met British troops in Klagenfurt, Austria in May 1945.

== Burma (Myanmar) ==
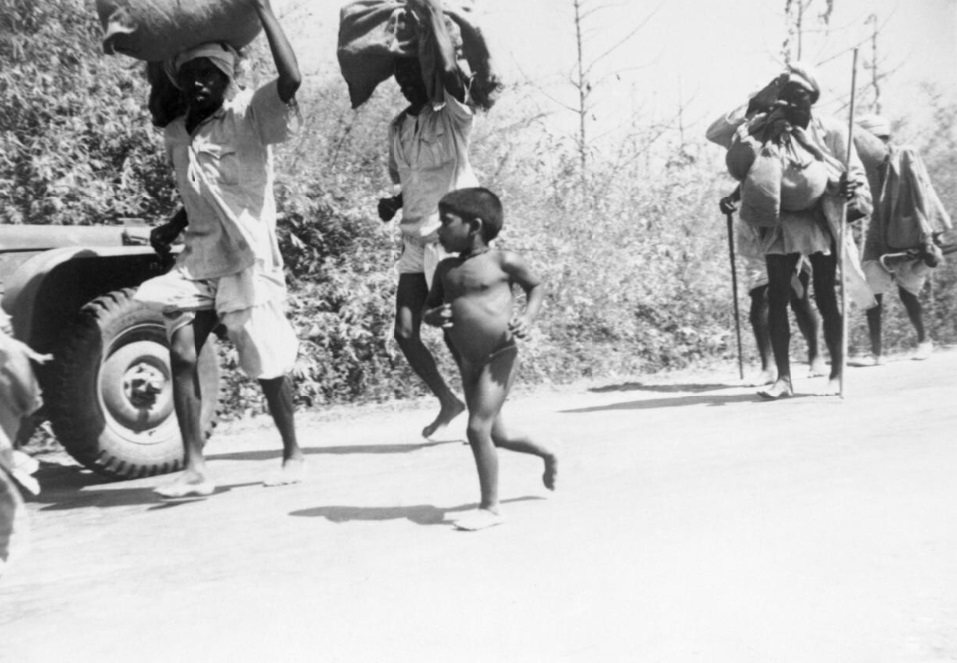
Refugees flee Burma along the Prome Road from Rangoon to Mandalay and eventually on to India, January 1942.

Burma was separated from British India in 1937 as a Crown Colony with a constitutional government. The colony was important for sending supplies to China via the Burma Road, which was completed in 1938. Nevertheless, it was left lightly defended at the outbreak of World War II: the British considered it a backwater and unlikely target of attack. Japan began its conquest of Burma with small raids in December 1941, launching a full invasion the following January. Japan held most of the country by April and ceded the Shan states to its ally Thailand.

Many Burmese hoped to gain support of the Japanese in expelling the British, so that Burma could become independent. Japan had already trained the Thirty Comrades, who now formed the nucleus of the Burma Independence Army. Japan declared the colony independent as the State of Burma on 1 August 1943. A puppet government led by Ba Maw was installed. However, many Burmese began to believe the Japanese had no intention of giving them real independence. Aung San and other nationalist leaders formed the Anti-Fascist Organisation in August 1944, which asked the United Kingdom to form a coalition with the other Allies against the Japanese.

Allied forces launched offensives into Burma beginning in late 1944. They captured Rangoon following the Battle of Elephant Point in May 1945. Subsequently, negotiations began between the Burmese and the British for independence. Under Japanese occupation, 170,000 to 250,000 civilians died.

== Canada ==
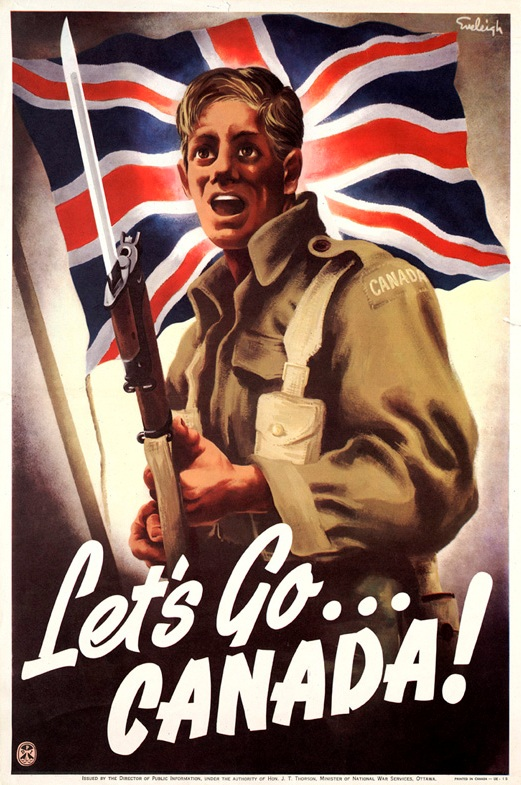
Propaganda Poster created by the Canadian Wartime Information Board, 1942

On 10 September 1939, Canada likewise declared war on Germany, this was the beginning of Canada's participation in the largest combined national effort in its history. Canada's military was active mainly in Italy, Northwestern Europe, and the North Atlantic.

Over the course of the war, 1.1 million Canadians served in the Army, Navy, and Air Force. Of these more than 45,000 lost their lives and another 54,000 were wounded. The financial cost was $21,786,077,519.13, between the 1939 and 1950 fiscal years. By the end of the War, Canada had the world's fourth largest air force, and third largest navy. As well, the Canadian Merchant Navy completed over 25,000 voyages across the Atlantic.

The scale and importance of Canadian contributions to the Battle of the Atlantic can be noted by the fact that Rear Admiral Leonard W. Murray became the only non-American or Brit to command an Allied theatre of operations when he was named Commander-in-Chief of Canadian Northwest Atlantic, a position he held from 1 April, 1943 through the end of the war.

In Canada, the British Commonwealth Air Training Plan trained more than 130,000 aircrew during the war, including almost half of all RAF, FAA, RAAF, RCAF, and RNZAF air crew in the war. The plan also trained pilots from Rhodesia, Argentina, Belgium, Ceylon, Czechoslovakia, Denmark, Finland, Fiji, Free France, Greece, the Netherlands, Newfoundland, Norway, Poland,and the United States. The scale and impact of the program led FDR to declare Canada the Aerodrome of Democracy. Canadians also served in the militaries of various Allied countries.

Canadian forces deployed to the United Kingdom in 1939 and 1st Canadian Division was on its way to the front in France in June of 1940 when it became clear France would surrender. The Division turned around and returned to Britain via the ports of Saint-Malo and Brest on the 17th and 18th of June. 1st Canadian Corps fought in Sicily and Italy while 2nd Canadian Corps fought in Northwest Europe beginning with the Dieppe raid on 19 August 1943, and participating in the Normandy landings on 6 June 1944, invading Juno Beach. This corps ultimately formed the backbone of 1st Canadian Army, along with British I Corps and XXX Corps, Polish 1st Armoured Division, the U.S. 104th Infantry Division and 1st Belgian Infantry Brigade. Ultimately, in February and March 1945, all Canadian forces in Europe had been reunited as part of the 1st Canadian Army, ending the war on German soil with five Canadian divisions.

In the Pacific, Canadian forces were some of the first to see combat against the Japanese, as a battalion each from the Royal Rifles of Canada and the Winnipeg Grenadiers had been stationed in defense of Hong Kong along with British and Indian units. The Battle of Hong Kong ended on Christmas Day, 1941 and those who had not been killed ended up prisoners of the Japanese for the remainder of the war.

The light cruiser HMCS Uganda, as part of the British Pacific Fleet took part in bombarding Okinawa and Truk.

During the war, Canada was subject to direct attack in the Battle of the St. Lawrence, and in the shelling of a lighthouse at Estevan Point in British Columbia.

The war had significant cultural, political and economic effects on Canada, including the conscription crisis. However, the war effort not only strengthened the Canadian economy but further established Canada as a major actor on the world stage.

== Caribbean Islands ==
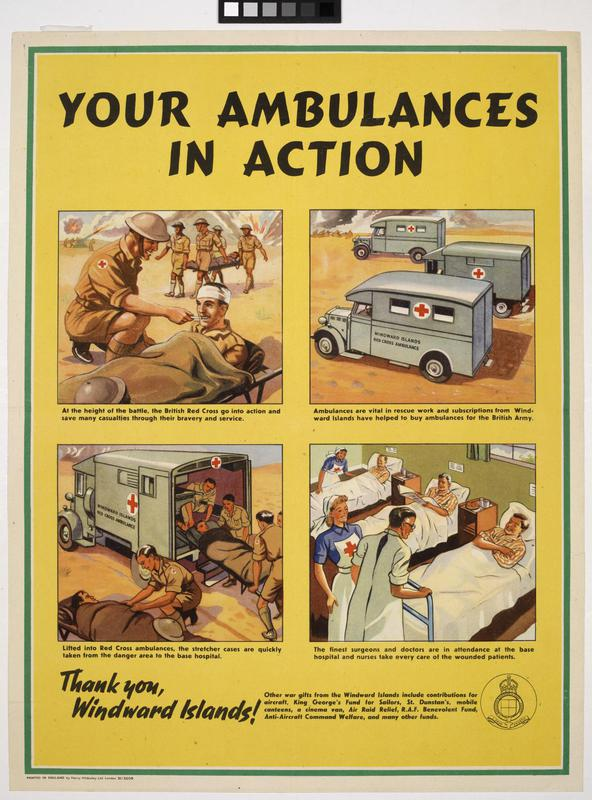
Funds were sent from the British Windward Islands to purchase ambulances for the Western Front, as detailed in this propaganda poster.

Over the course of World War II, the United States assumed Britain's defense responsibilities in the Caribbean. In September 1940, the two countries agreed to the Lend-Lease Agreement (also called the Destroyers-for-Bases Agreement). It involved the loan of American destroyers in return for leasing, rent free for ninety-nine years, eleven naval and air bases on British territory, including the Bahamas, Jamaica, Antigua, St. Lucia, Trinidad and Tobago, British Guiana, and Bermuda, as well as Newfoundland. The eastern Caribbean became the forward edge of American defense strategy, formalized in the Panama Declaration of 1939. American strategists called the West Indies as "the bulwark that we watch."

More than 50 percent of the supplies sent to Europe and Africa from the United States were shipped from ports in the Gulf of Mexico and passed through the Caribbean. One year after the Pearl Harbor attack, the United States Caribbean Defense Command reached a total of 119,000 personnel, half of them stationed in Panama to protect the canal from an anticipated Japanese attack. Meanwhile, the German Kriegsmarine inflicted massive damage on shipping in the Caribbean in 1942. By the end of that year, U-boats operating in the Caribbean had sunk 336 ships, at least half of which were oil tankers.

Parts of the Caribbean had been colonized by countries that now came under Axis occupation. Aruba and Curaçao remained loyal to the Dutch government-in-exile, but because they housed valuable refineries that processed Venezuelan petroleum, they were placed under British protection. Both islands were subjected to German attacks in Operation Neuland. In 1942 they were transferred to the United States, which had also stationed troops in Surinam in 1941 to secure its bauxite mines. Martinique and Guadeloupe came under the control of Vichy France. American and British pressure ensured that several French ships, including its only aircraft carrier, Béarn, remained interned at Martinique. Thousands of refugees fled, many going to Dominica, while an anti-Vichy resistance movement grew. The islands, along with French Guiana, switched to Free France in 1943.

== Ceylon (Sri Lanka) ==
Ceylon (now known as Sri Lanka), was a British colony and a major Allied naval base. On 5 April 1942, over 300 aircraft from Japanese carriers bombed the island. Winston Churchill called it "the most dangerous moment" of World War II, because the Japanese wished to replicate a grander success of the attack at Pearl Harbor. British ships, however, were moved to Addu Atoll, Maldives Islands. Nevertheless, the British lost an aircraft carrier, two cruisers, and two destroyers, while the Royal Air Force squadrons on Ceylon suffered severe losses.

The Ceylon Garrison Artillery Regiment was stationed on Horsburgh Island in the Cocos Islands, to defend it from Japanese attack. However, the regiment mutinied on the night of 8 May 1942, intending to hand the islands over to the Japanese. The mutiny was suppressed and three of the Ceylonese soldiers were executed.

Following the Cocos Islands Mutiny, no Ceylonese combat unit was deployed in front-line combat, although Supply & Transport Corps troops were used in rear areas in the Middle East. The defences of Sri Lanka were beefed up to three Allied army divisions because the island was strategically important, as a producer of rubber. Ceylonese in Japanese-occupied Malaya and Singapore were recruited by the Japanese for the Lanka Regiment of the Indian National Army, to fight against the Allies. They never actually saw action.

== Chile ==
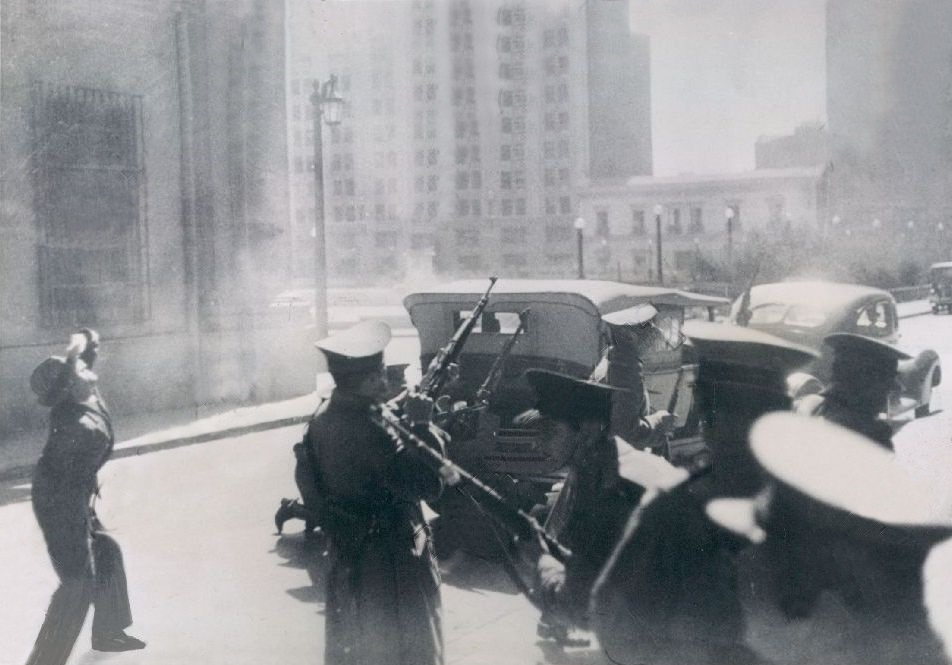
Chilean Carabineros open fire on Nacistas occupying the Seguro Obrero building, 5 September 1938.

Chile declared its neutrality upon the outbreak of war in Europe, having close trading links with Germany. Later in the war, however, Chile actively distanced itself from the Axis powers, and the Chilean government took steps to dismiss pro-German military officers. An attempted Nazi-backed coup in September 1938 turned most of the Chilean population against the German community within Chile. Following the sinking of the Toltén by a Nazi submarine off the coast of New Jersey and anti-German demonstrations in Chile, relations with Axis countries were broken on January 20, 1943. Throughout the duration of the war, Chilean naval presence around Easter Island was strengthened to ward-off a feared Japanese attack (as the Japanese had territorial ambitions for all the islands of Polynesia to be under their rule), and bolstered defensive capabilities at the vital harbors of Antofagasta, Coquimbo, Valparaíso and Talcahuano. Chilean merchant naval ships also aided Peruvian, Colombian and Cuban ships in patrolling the area around the Panama Canal Zone during the Battle of the Caribbean. From 1943 to 1945, the Chilean prison camp of Pisagua became the site of wartime internment for citizens of enemy nations. Chile eventually declared war on Japan on April 13, 1945, becoming the last country in South America to do so. In mid-2017, newly declassified documents revealed that Chile's Investigative Police units had stopped a Nazi spy ring's plot to bomb Northern Chilean copper mines and blow up the Panama Canal.

== China ==
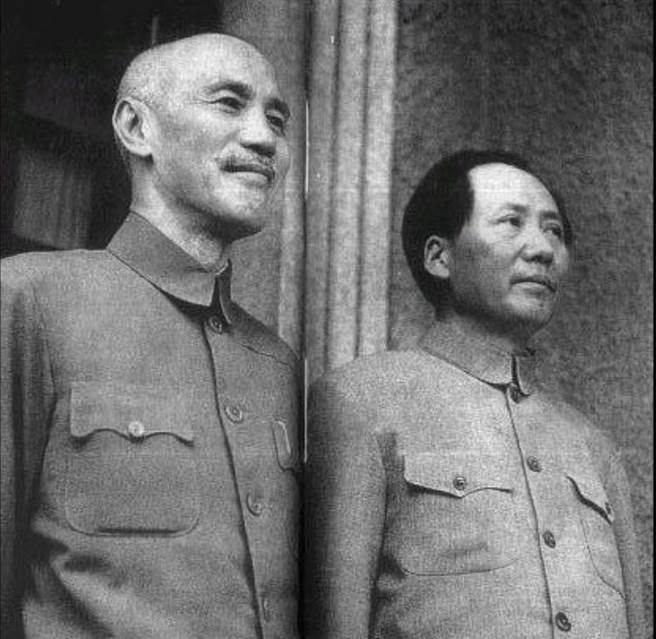
Chiang Kai-shek and Mao Zedong meet in Chongqing, 1945.

The Republic of China had been fighting Japan intermittently since the 1931 Mukden incident, when Japan annexed Manchuria. On 7 July 1937, the Marco Polo Bridge incident led the two countries to full-scale war. With this and civil conflict between the Kuomintang (KMT, Chinese Nationalist Party) and the Chinese Communist Party, the Chinese Nationalist Government's full attention was within its borders. However, Generalissimo Chiang Kai-shek still managed to send troops to Britain's aid in Burma, in early 1942. More than 1.5 million Japanese military personnel were bogged down in China with casualties estimated at 1.1–1.9 million. At the start of the war, the Chinese army had 2.6 million soldiers; by end of the war it had grown to 5.7 million (excluding communist soldiers).

The war cooled China's formerly warm relations with Germany (see Sino-German cooperation), and following the Japanese attack on Pearl Harbor, China formally joined the Allies and declared war on Germany on 9 December 1941.

Many of China's urban centers, industrial resources, and coastal regions were occupied by Japan for most of the war. China suffered a large death toll from the war, both military and civilian. The Chinese Nationalist army suffered some 3.2 million casualties, and 17 million civilians died in the crossfire. After the war, China gained one of the permanent seats on the United Nations Security Council.

Although the Nationalists and Communists had cooperated to oppose the Japanese, once the war was over the Chinese Civil War erupted once again. The Nationalist government was defeated by the Communists in 1949 and retreated to Taiwan, while the communist People's Republic of China was established on the mainland.

== Colombia ==
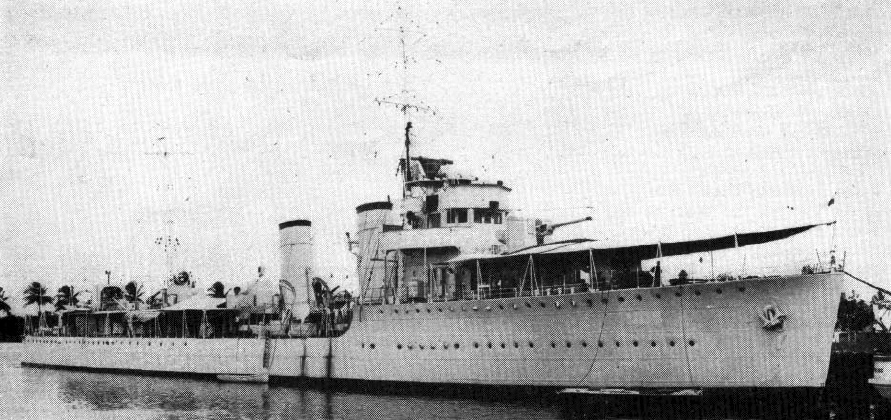
The destroyer ARC Caldas in the 1940s

After the attack on Pearl Harbor, Colombia broke diplomatic relations with the Axis powers. Colombia provided the Allies with petroleum products. In 1943, the German submarine U-505 destroyed a Colombian schooner, which caused Colombia to declare a "status of belligerency" against Germany on 26 November 1943.

The German ambassador left the country, and measures of control were implemented, including the internment of German citizens in designated areas. Photographs and reconnaissance airplanes belonging to the Colombian-German company Scadta, which used to take aerial shots of Colombian and German cities, were also handed to the United States. The Colombian Navy assisted in patrolling the waters near the Panama Canal Zone and participated in the Battle of the Caribbean. The only notable engagement occurred in 1944: the destroyer ARC Caldas attacked the German submarine U-154, which faked its own destruction in order to escape.

== Costa Rica ==
Left-wing reformist President Rafael Ángel Calderón Guardia was an ally of Franklin Roosevelt and hostile to Nazism. In 1940, it was reported that Calderón and Roosevelt had agreed to the construction of an American base on Cocos Island, Costa Rica's territory in the Pacific; however, the United States ultimately decided on a base in the Galápagos instead. Costa Rica joined the Allies on 8 December 1941, declaring war on Japan the day after the attack on Pearl Harbor, and on Germany and Italy shortly afterwards. Costa Rica was the first country in America to declare war on the Empire of Japan, on solidarity to the people of the United States. While Costa Rica's small army of 500 men could not contribute directly to the fighting, Calderón's administration introduced wartime measures against people from Axis nations in the country, including property seizure and internment. Targets included Germans, Italians, and Spaniards, the last of whom were viewed as franquistas sympathetic to fascism.

== Cuba ==
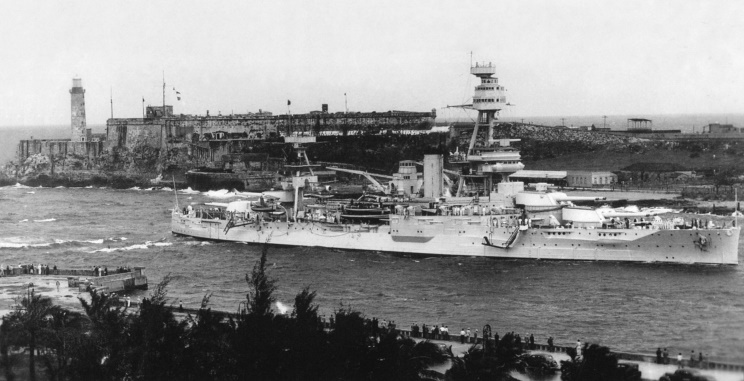
With Morro Castle in the background, the USS Texas sails into Havana Harbor, February 1940.

President Federico Laredo Brú led Cuba when war broke out in Europe, though real power belonged to Fulgencio Batista as Chief of Staff of the army. In 1940, Laredo Brú denied entry to 900 Jewish refugees who arrived in Havana aboard the German oceanliner MS St. Louis. After both the United States and Canada likewise refused to accept the refugees, they returned to Europe, where many were eventually murdered in the Holocaust. Batista became president in his own right following the election of 1940. He cooperated with the United States as it moved closer to war against the Axis. Cuba declared war on Japan on 8 December 1941, and on Germany and Italy on 11 December.

Cuba was an important participant in the Battle of the Caribbean and its navy gained a reputation for skill and efficiency. The navy escorted hundreds of Allied ships through hostile waters, flew thousands of hours on convoy and patrol duty, and rescued over 200 victims of German U-boat attacks from the sea. Six Cuban merchant ships were sunk by U-boats, taking the lives of around eighty sailors. On 15 May 1943, a squadron of Cuban submarine chasers sank the German submarine U-176 near Cayo Blanquizal. Cuba received millions of dollars in American military aid through the Lend-Lease program, which included air bases, aircraft, weapons, and training. The United States naval station at Guantanamo Bay also served as a base for convoys passing between the mainland United States and the Panama Canal or other points in the Caribbean.

== Cyprus ==
The Cyprus Regiment was founded on 12 April 1940, and made part of the British Army structure. It was mostly volunteers from the Greek and Turkish Cypriot inhabitants of Cyprus, but also included other Commonwealth nationalities. About 30,000 Cypriots served in the Regiment. It included Infantry, Mechanical, Transport, and Pack Transport Companies. Cypriot mule drivers were the first colonial troops sent to the Western Front. They served in France, Ethiopia and Italy carrying equipment to areas inaccessible to vehicles. The regiment served at Dunkirk, in the Greek campaign (Battle of Greece), North Africa (Operation Compass), France, the Middle East and Italy. In the post war years and prior to its disbandment, the regiment served in Cyprus and the Middle East, including Palestine in 1945–1948. The Regiment was disbanded on 31 March 1950.

== Czechoslovakia ==
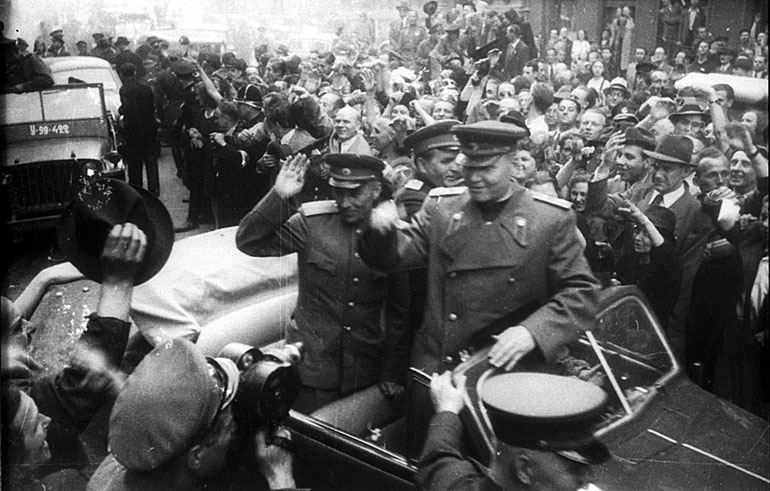
Residents of Prague greet Soviet Marshal Ivan Konev, 1945.

Czechoslovakia was dismembered starting with the Munich Agreement and by the First Vienna Award in 1938. As a result, the Sudetenland became part of Germany, Trans-Olza was annexed by Poland, and southern Czechoslovakia became part of Hungary. Later on, the newly separated Slovak Republic, a Nazi-dependent puppet regime led by Roman Catholic priest Jozef Tiso was set up, while the remainder of Carpathian Ruthenia was occupied and annexed by Hungary. The next day the Czech part of the country became the Protectorate of Bohemia and Moravia under state-President Emil Hácha.

From 1940, a government-in-exile in London under former Czechoslovak President Edvard Beneš was recognized as an Allied power.

=== Protectorate of Bohemia and Moravia ===
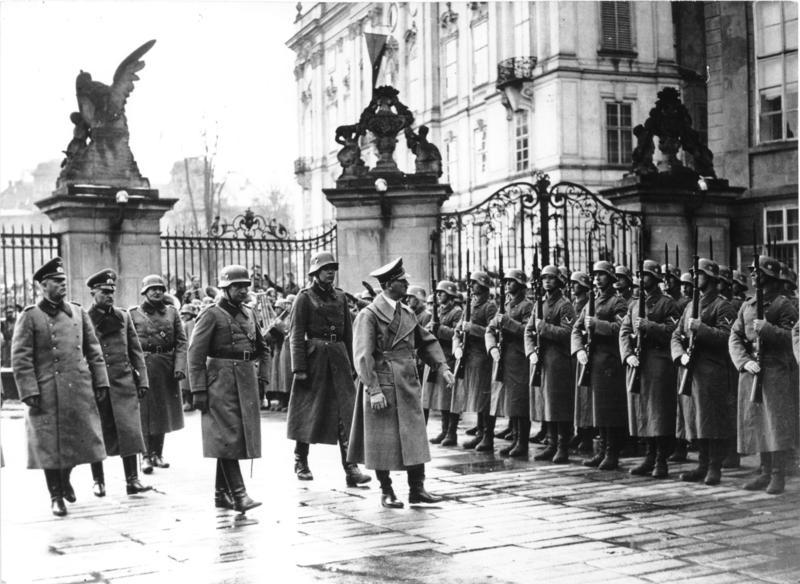
Hitler on his visit to Prague Castle after the establishment of the German protectorate, 1939.

German leader Adolf Hitler established the protectorate on 16 March 1939, issuing a proclamation from Prague Castle. The creation of the protectorate violated the Munich Agreement.

The protectorate remained nominally autonomous and had a dual system of government, with German law applying to ethnic Germans while other residents had the legal status of Protectorate subjects and were governed by a puppet Czech administration. During World War II, the well-trained Czech workforce and developed industry were forced to make a major contribution to the German war economy. Since the Protectorate was just out of the reach of Allied bombers based in Britain, the Czech economy was able to work almost undisturbed until the end of the war. The Protectorate administration became deeply involved in the Holocaust in Bohemia and Moravia. The state's existence came to an end with the surrender of Germany to the Allies in May 1945.

=== Slovak Republic (Slovakia) ===
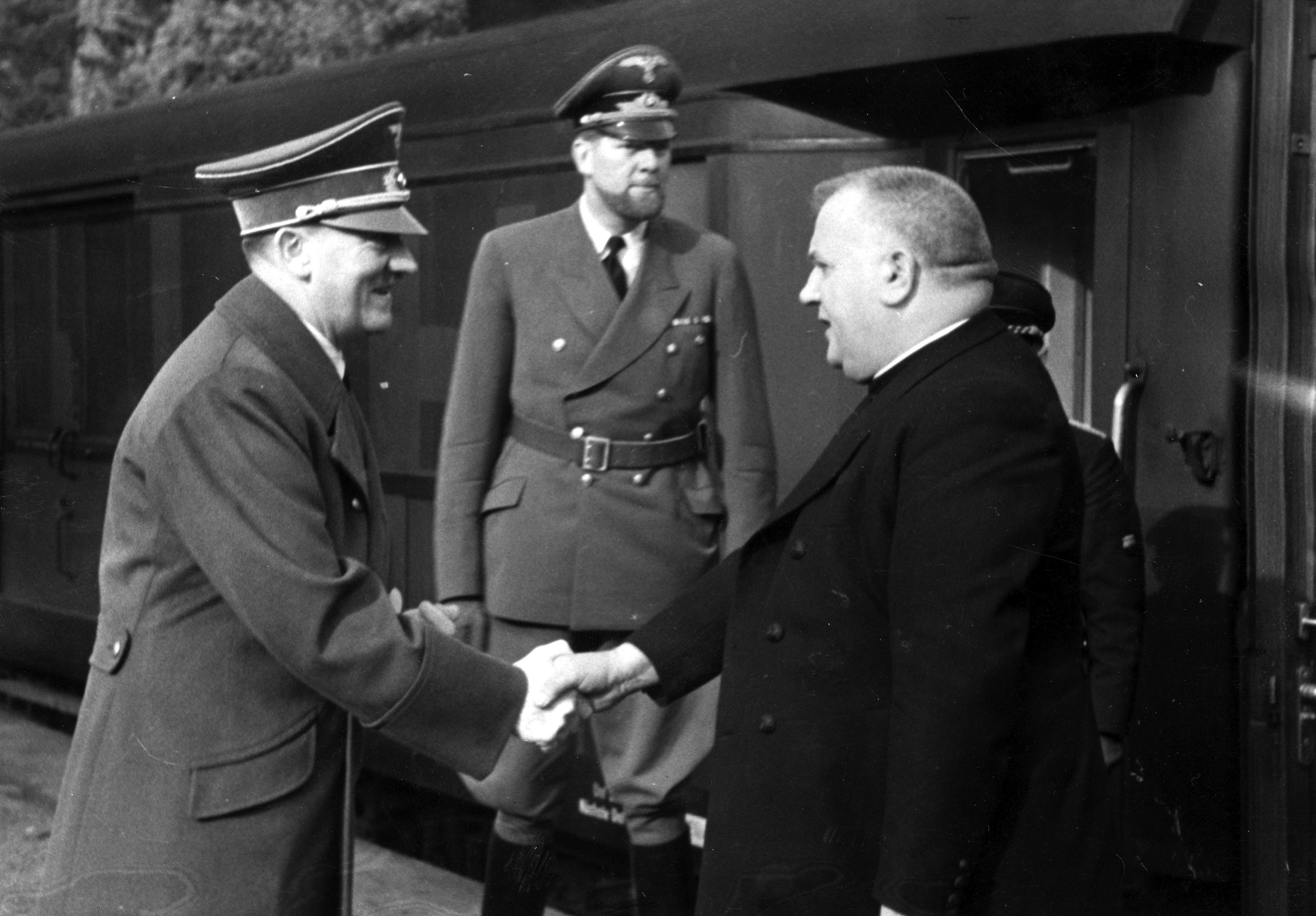
Adolf Hitler greeting Jozef Tiso, president of the Slovak Republic, 1941

The newly founded Slovak Republic led by Jozef Tiso was proclaimed on March 14, 1939, allying with Nazi Germany and its armed forces participated in war against Poland and Soviet Union. On 24 November 1940, Slovakia joined the Axis when its leaders signed the Tripartite Pact.

The local Jewish population was heavily persecuted. As part of the Holocaust in Slovakia, 75,000 Jews out of 80,000 in Slovakia were deported and taken to German death camps.

The Slovak National Uprising, commenced in August 1944 was suppressed by German forces at the end of October; partisans, however, continued fighting in the mountains until the war's end. In April 1945, the Red Army defeated the Germans and ousted Tiso's government, and restored the Czechoslovak state.

== Danzig ==
The Free City of Danzig, a semi-autonomous city-state under League of Nations protection, was predominantly German and had a Nazi government by 1936. On 30 August 1939, Germany gave Poland an ultimatum demanding control of the city, provoking the Danzig crisis and the invasion of Poland on 1 September. The city-state aided Nazi Germany during the invasion and then was annexed to Germany and lost its independent role.

== Denmark ==
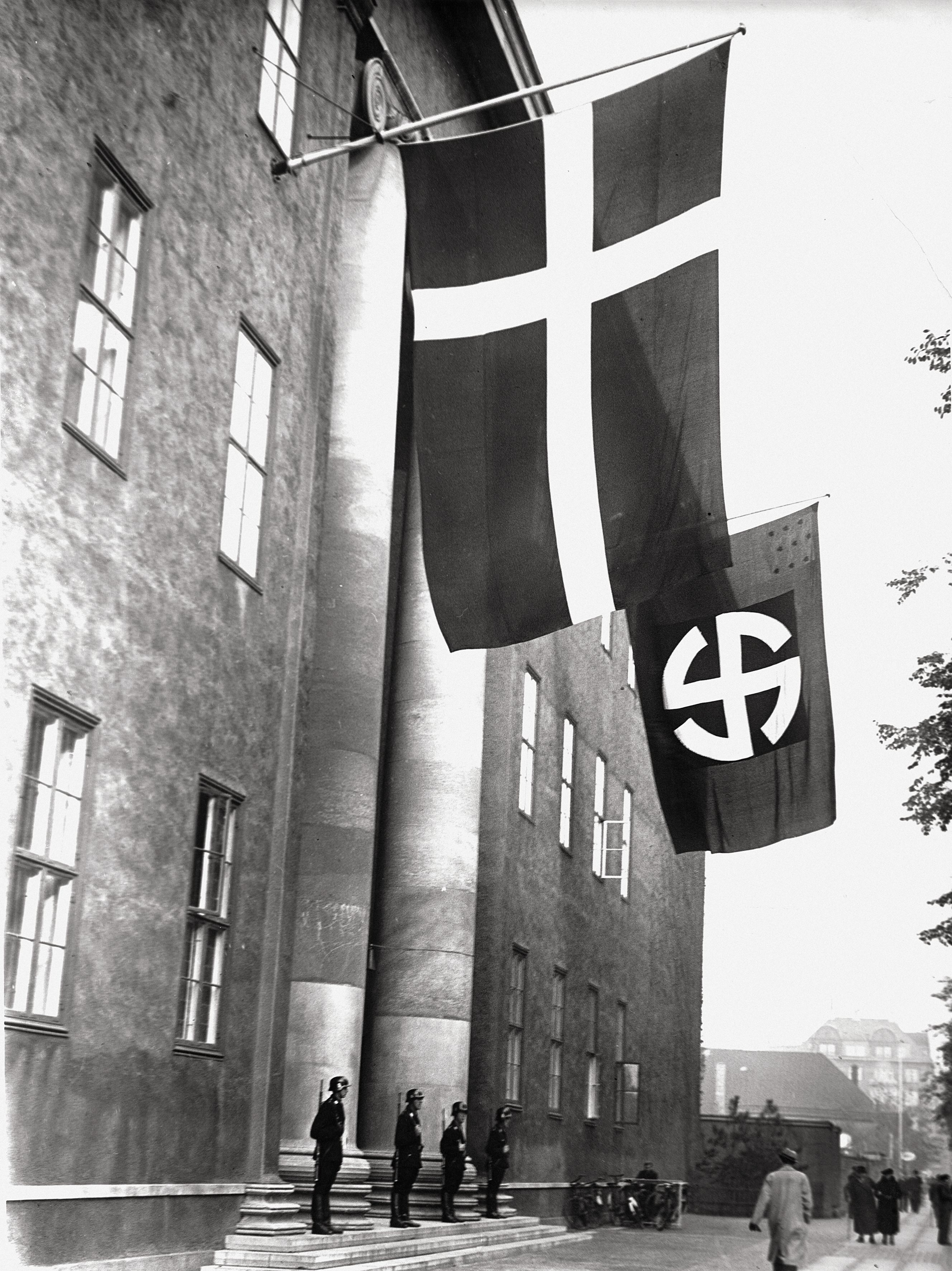
Headquarters of the Schalburg Corps, a Danish SS unit, in Copenhagen after 1943.

Denmark officially remained neutral from the outbreak of the war. Germany invaded without declaration of war as part of Operation Weserübung on 9 April 1940, and overwhelmed Denmark in a few hours of fighting.

The Danish government remained in office in Copenhagen until 1943 and signed the Anti-Comintern Pact. On 29 August 1943, the government resigned and dissolved, as a response to German demands for more concessions. Denmark was now under German military occupation. Civil affairs were handled by SS-general Werner Best.

On 4 May 1945, German forces in Denmark surrendered to the British army. Since the German commander of the eastern island of Bornholm refused to surrender to the Soviet Union, two local towns were bombed and the garrison forced to surrender. Bornholm remained under Soviet control until 1946.

=== Faroe Islands and Greenland ===
On 10 May 1940, the British invaded Iceland and the Danish Faroe Islands. The United States occupied Greenland, a position later supported by the Danish envoy in Washington, Henrik Kauffmann. Iceland, which was later transferred from British to American control, declared independence in 1944.

== Dominican Republic ==
The Dominican Republic declared war on Germany and Japan following the attacks of Pearl Harbor and the Nazi declaration of war on the U.S. It did not directly contribute with troops, aircraft, or ships, however 112 Dominicans were integrated into the U.S. military and fought in the war. In addition, 27 Dominicans were killed when German submarines sank four Dominican-crewed ships in the Caribbean.

== Dutch East Indies (Indonesia) ==
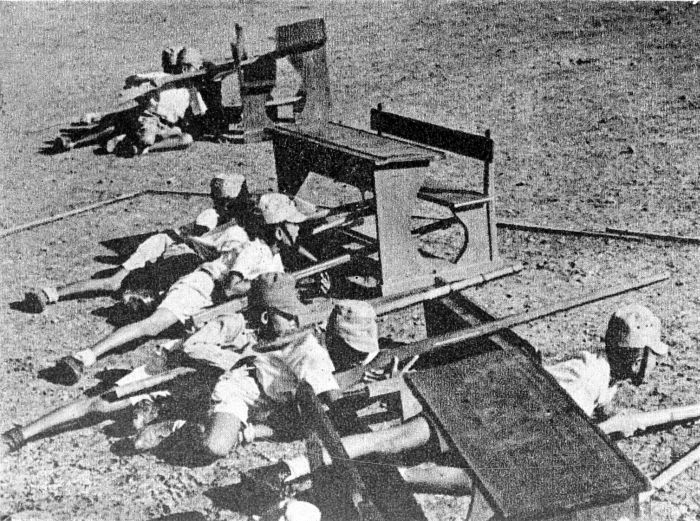
Young Indonesian boys being trained by the Imperial Japanese Army, c. 1945

The rich petroleum resources of the Dutch East Indies were a prime objective of the Japanese military in its attack on the Allies from 7 December 1941. The Royal Netherlands Navy and the Royal Netherlands East Indies Army were part of the American-British-Dutch-Australian Command, but with the Netherlands having been occupied by Germany in 1940, the country was little able to defend its colony. The Japanese navy and army overran Dutch and allied forces in less than three months, completing the occupation in March 1942. Some Dutch personnel and ships escaped to Australia, where they continued to fight the Japanese.

The period of the Japanese occupation was one of the most critical in Indonesian history. Initially, many Indonesians joyfully welcomed the Japanese as liberators from Dutch colonialism. The sentiment changed, however, as Indonesians realized that they were expected to endure hardships for the Japanese war effort. In Java and Sumatra, the Japanese educated, trained and armed many young Indonesians and gave nationalist leaders a political voice. In this way, the Japanese occupation created the conditions for Indonesian independence.

In 1944–1945, Allied troops largely bypassed Indonesia. Therefore, most of the colony was still under Japanese occupation at the time of its surrender in August 1945. The Proclamation of Indonesian Independence was read within days of the Japanese surrender in the Pacific. The Indonesian National Revolution followed, winning independence for the country in 1949. A later UN report stated that four million people died in Indonesia as a result of the Japanese occupation. About 2.4 million people died in Java from famine during 1944–45.

== Ecuador ==
Ecuador was one of several South American nations to join the Allies late in the war (joined against Germany on 2 February 1945), allowing the United States use of Baltra Island as a naval base.

== Egypt ==
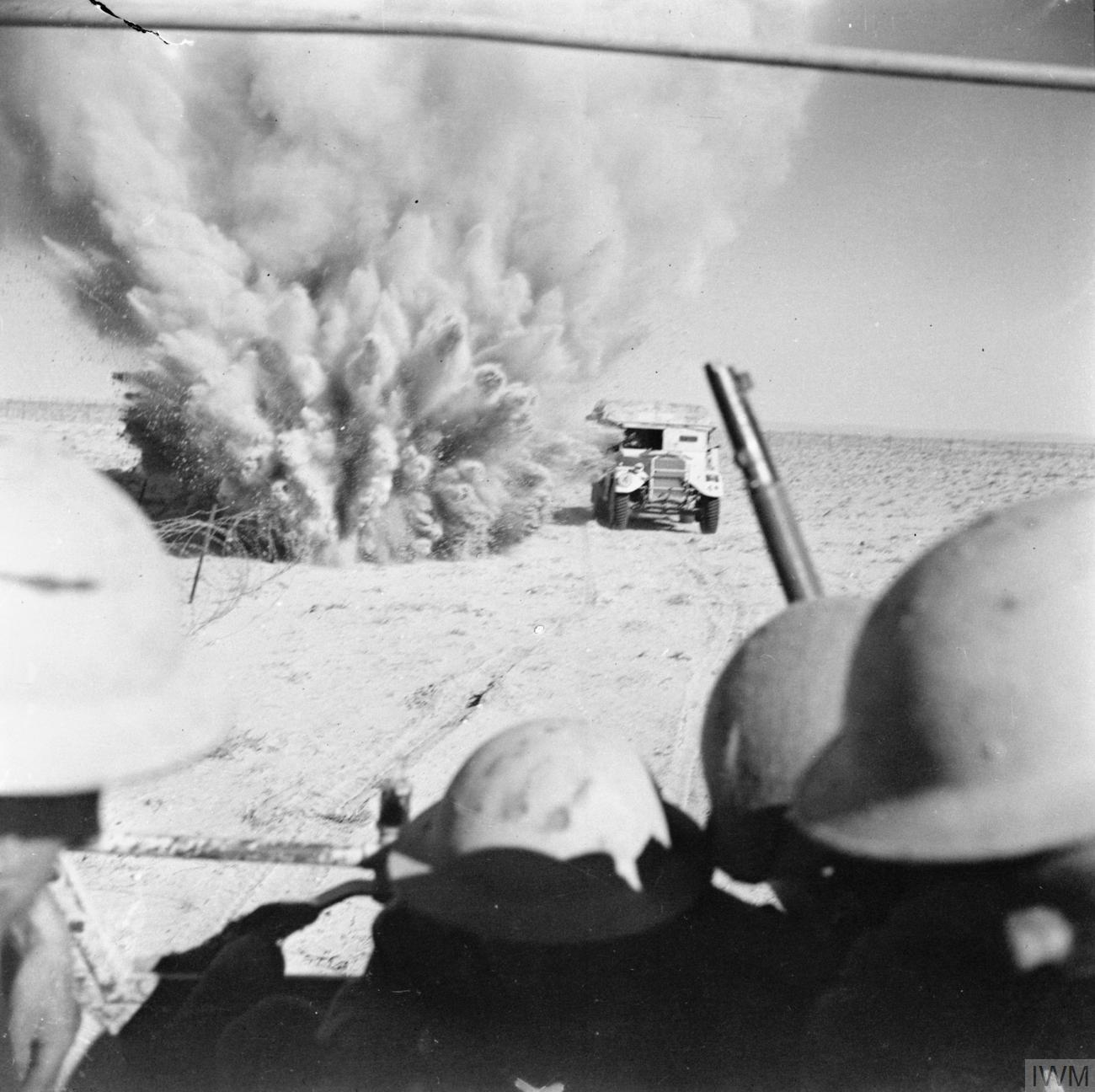
A mine explodes close to a British artillery tractor as it advances through minefields at the Second Battle of El Alamein.

Britain had unilaterally recognized the independence of Egypt in 1922, but continued to occupy the country militarily, and to dominate it. By the Anglo–Egyptian Treaty of 1936, the British occupation was limited to the Suez Canal Zone, but it allowed British troops to re-occupy the rest of the country in time of war.

Egypt was of vital strategic importance because of the Suez Canal and Egypt's central geographical location. The Egyptian government supplied the British forces, but some engaged in secret negotiations with Germany about the prospect of Egypt's joining the Axis should the British be defeated in the Western Desert campaign. Many Egyptian politicians and army officers sought Axis support for removing the occupying British forces from the country.

After British forces defeated the initial Italian invasion, Germany entered the North African theatre to save Italian Libya. A series of German victories brought Axis forces within 160 kilometres (99 miles) of Cairo, creating great expectation among Egyptian nationalists. However, British victory at El-Alamein heralded the end of Axis advances in Egypt, and the eventual Axis defeat in North Africa. Although Egypt had almost all of its military fighting the Axis on the western desert campaign, King Farouk still resisted British pressure to declare war on Germany until 1945.

== El Salvador ==
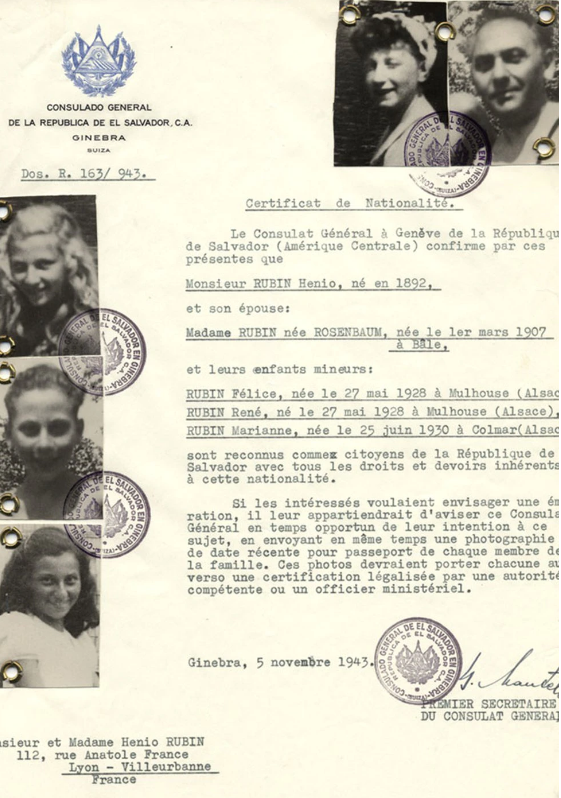
Representation of documents that were given to a Jewish family from Central Europe. Most of the Jews that came to El Salvador were from Germany, Poland, Hungary and Switzerland. 40,000 people were saved with Salvadoran citizenship documents like these, given by José Castellanos Contreras and José Gustavo Guerrero.

From 1931 to 1944, El Salvador was ruled by the military dictator Maximiliano Hernández Martínez, an admirer of Hitler and Mussolini. Despite his personal admiration, Hernández Martínez declared war on both Japan (8 December 1941) and Germany (12 December 1941) shortly after the attack on Pearl Harbor due to El Salvador's strong economic ties with the United States. He removed Germans from the government and interned Japanese, German, and Italian nationals. The Second World War made Salvadorans weary of their dictatorship, and a general national strike in 1944 forced Hernández Martínez to resign and flee to Guatemala. Postwar, he was later killed in Honduras by a vengeful Salvadoran citizen.

José Castellanos Contreras was a Salvadoran army colonel and diplomat who, while working as El Salvador's Consul General for Geneva during World War II, and together with a Jewish-Hungarian businessman named György Mandl, helped save up to 40,000 Jews and Central Europeans from Nazi persecution by providing them with false papers of Salvadoran nationality.

José Gustavo Guerrero was a Salvadoran judge who challenged the Nazis during Hitler's invasion on Europe. The distinguished Salvadoran jurist lived in Europe for many years in his career as a diplomat and as presiding judge of the Permanent Court of International Justice, based in The Hague, Netherlands.

In 1937, during the rise of Nazism in Europe, Doctor Guerrero took over as president, until he was forced to leave in 1940 by the Nazis. Precisely after the fall of the Netherlands, on May 17, 1940, the Nazis tried to take the Peace Palace of the Permanent Court of International in The Hague, but there they met the Salvadoran, the only judge who stayed with a group of Dutch officers. When a German general approached, the Presiding Judge told him: "The Court and its staff are inviolable. Only on my body can they enter the palace." For this and others before courage in defense of Universal Law, Guerrero was twice nominated for the Nobel Peace Prize.

Once established in Geneva, Guerrero was visited by the Consul General of El Salvador in Switzerland, Colonel José Castellanos Contreras, who had fled from Germany, where he served as Consul until El Salvador broke relations with the Hitler regime.

Castellanos had already granted several visas to people of Jewish origin who were persecuted by the Nazis. However, now that it was part of a larger project: the handing over of false documents of Salvadoran nationality to people of Jewish origin. Castellanos then consulted Guerrero, who immediately agreed to the plan that saved the lives of thousands of Jews. According to the investigations, Guerrero would have contributed to writing the text of the document that was then given to them to save their lives.

== Estonia ==
The August 1939 Molotov–Ribbentrop Pact between Nazi Germany and the Soviet Union left Estonia in the Soviet sphere of interest. The Soviet Union threatened Estonia with war if Estonia did not agree with "a mutual assistance pact", which would allow the Soviet troops to use several military bases in Estonia during a 10-year period. The Estonian government, convinced that a war against USSR would be inevitably lost, agreed on 28 September 1939. The Soviets conducted a coup d'état with the start of the full Soviet occupation of Estonia by the Red Army in June 1940, and a sham election was held under Soviet control. The new government took office and the Estonian Soviet Socialist Republic was proclaimed on 21 July 1940. The puppet state was formally accepted into the Soviet Union on 6 August. The legality of the annexation was not recognized by most Western countries and the Baltic states continued to exist formally as independent nations until they regained independence in 1991.

Estonia was occupied by Germany in 1941 after war broke out between Germany and the Soviet Union. With the return of the Soviet Armed Forces, 70,000 Estonians joined or were conscripted by the German side to fight the Soviets. The National Committee failed to restore the national government in September 1944 due to the Soviet reoccupation. At the end of the war, the subsequent Forest Brothers armed insurrection against the Soviet authorities started, which lasted in the Baltic states until the mid-1950s. Estonia remained a de facto part of the USSR until 1991.

== Ethiopia ==
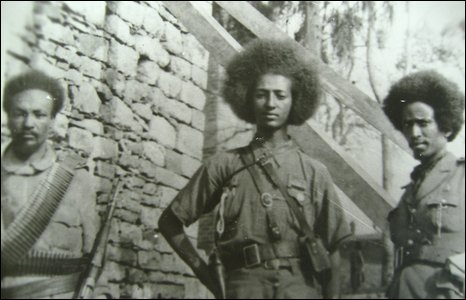
Jagama Kello (center) with two other Arbegnoch fighters, 1940

At the outbreak of the war, Ethiopia was under Italian occupation and Emperor Haile Selassie of Ethiopia was in exile in England trying in vain to obtain Allied support for his nation's cause. The Arbegnoch movement had begun its guerrilla war against the occupying Italian forces the day Addis Ababa fell in May 1936. Upon the emperor's flight into exile, remnants of Ethiopia's disbanded imperial army had transformed into guerrilla units. Urban city residents throughout the country formed underground movements to aid the Patriots as the overall population led a passive resistance campaign aimed at stifling Mussolini's economic agenda for the region. Throughout the occupation and into the beginning of the Second World War, the constant harassment of Italian columns and communication and supply lines reduced their fighting capabilities and their morale. A state of paranoia among Italian troops and civilians alike had sunk in as they became increasingly isolated from Rome. Fascist retaliation to Patriot attacks was brutal and often targeted the civilian population, which only further filled the ranks of the Patriots creating a cycle that led to the eventual demise of Mussolini's Italian East Africa.

Britain's declaration of war against Italy reinvigorated the Patriot movement and paved the way for the final ousting of the Italians in Ethiopia and in the Horn of Africa. The Allied liberation campaign of Ethiopia began in the winter of 1940. Emperor Haile Selassie, with the support and cooperation of the British, was transported to the Sudan to work alongside Major Orde Wingate to organize and lead the main Ethiopian Patriot divisions that had fled fascist-controlled Ethiopia upon news of Britain's declaration of war. The East African campaign was conducted by a largely multi-African force and consisted of Ethiopian, Eritrean, British, Sudanese, Kenyan, Rhodesian, South African, Indian, Nigerian, Ghanaian and Free French Forces. Within months, the liberation of Ethiopia was achieved, and on 5 May 1941, five years to the day that the Emperor fled his capital, Haile Selassie was restored to his throne. The defeat of fascists in Ethiopia marked the first victory for the Allies in the Second World War and allowed for the remaining forces to be quickly moved up to Egypt to confront the Axis advance towards Cairo.

== Fiji ==
Fiji was a British colony during World War II. The Fiji Defence Force served with New Zealand Army formations, under the Allied Pacific Ocean Areas command. The Fiji Infantry Regiment fought in the Solomon Islands campaign against the Japanese. Fiji became a major military sea port for convoy traffic between the U.S. and Australia. It was the closest reasonably safe route around the embattled Solomon Islands, a stopping-off point for troops and supplies being shipped to the Solomons, just to the north, and the closest protected harbor available to ships damaged around Guadalcanal. Fiji also constructed many facilities such as airfields for Allied bombing runs, barracks and training grounds.

== Finland ==
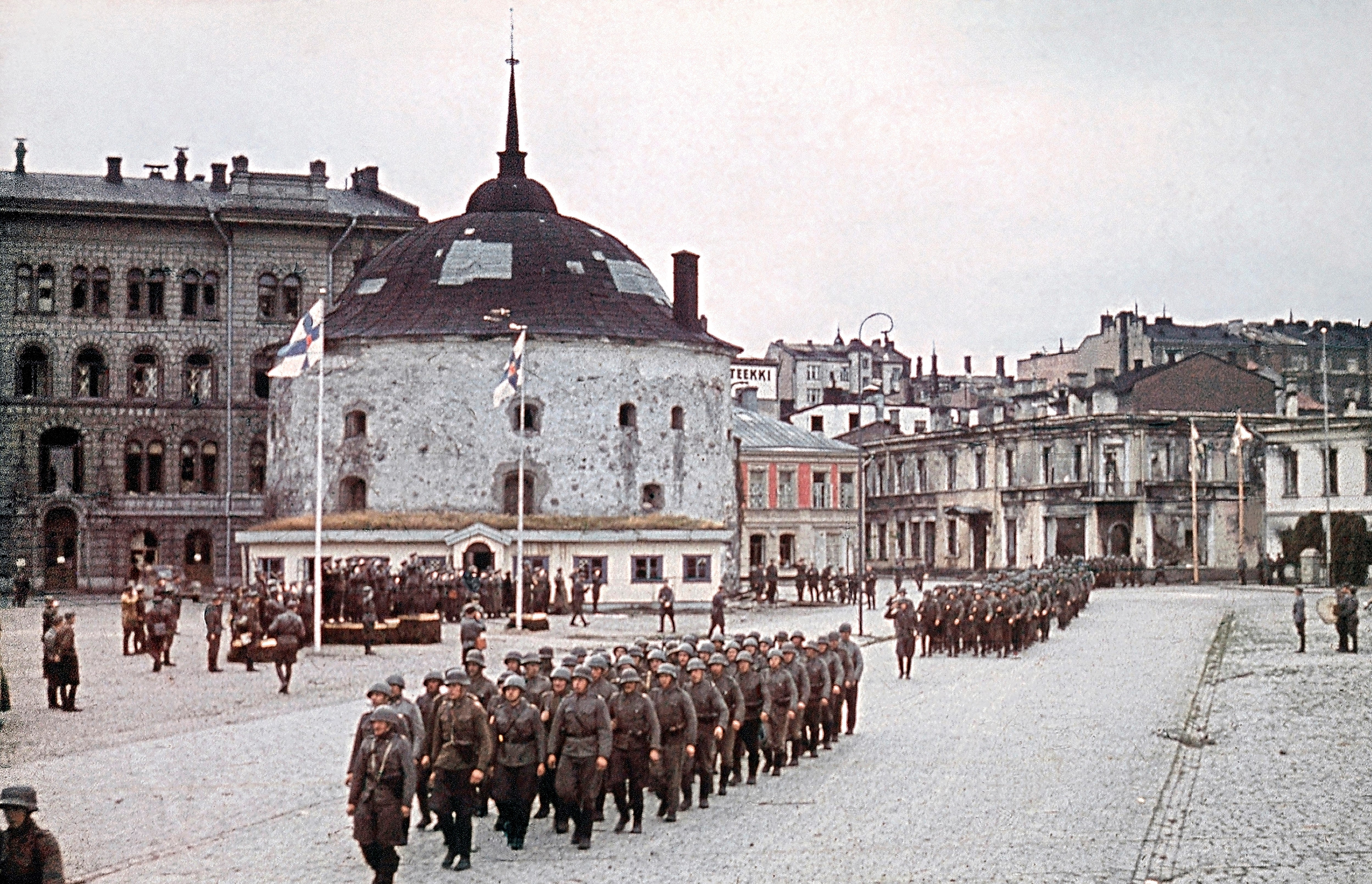
Finnish soldiers on parade after the recapture of Vyborg, August 1941

Finland was left to the Soviet sphere of interest in Molotov–Ribbentrop Pact, and when it refused to allow the Soviet Union to build bases on its territory, it was attacked by Soviet forces in the Winter War (30 November 1939 – 13 March 1940). After the war, Finland unsuccessfully sought protection from the United Kingdom and from Sweden to counter the continuing Soviet pressure, before turning to improving relations with Nazi Germany. This produced cooperation between the countries, which led three days after the start of Operation Barbarossa to a Soviet pre-emptive air attack on Finland, which started the Continuation War (25 June 1941 – 4 September 1944), in which Finland was a co-belligerent of Germany. The UK declared war on Finland on 6 December 1941. Canada and New Zealand declared war on Finland on 7 December, as did Australia and South Africa the following day.

To secure military support needed to stop the Vyborg–Petrozavodsk Offensive coordinated with D-Day, the Ryti–Ribbentrop Agreement was signed on 26 June 1944, in which Finnish and Nazi German relations became closest to an alliance. An armistice was signed after the Soviet offensive was fought to a standstill, and the Wehrmacht was retreating from the Baltic states. The treaty required Finland to expel all German troops, which led to the Lapland War (15 September 1944 – 25 April 1945). This was shortly before the complete surrender of Nazi forces all over Europe on 7–8 May 1945 (V-E Day). Complete peace with the UK and the USSR was concluded in the Paris Peace Treaties, 1947.

== France ==
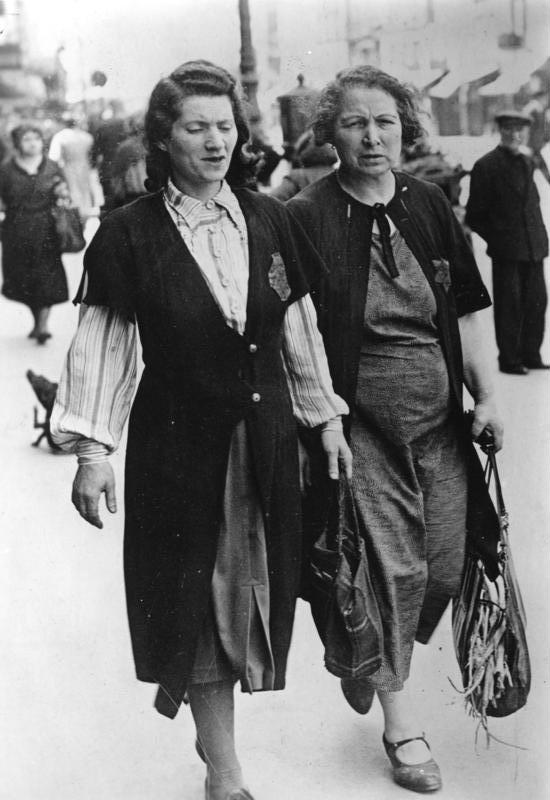
French Jewish women wearing the yellow badge, Paris, 1942

France was one of the original guarantors of Polish security and as such was one of the first countries to declare war on Germany. For several months, little fighting occurred in the Phoney War or drôle de guerre ("funny war"). On May 10, 1940, Germany began its attack on France. After six weeks of intense battling, the French government signed the Armistice of 22 June 1940.

After the armistice, France was split into two parts, an occupied sector and an unoccupied sector. Within Occupied France, Otto von Stülpnagel and his cousin and successor, Carl-Heinrich, led a military administration. Citizens were subjected to the Service du travail obligatoire, a program of forced labor in Germany. Jews and Roma faced the persecution of the Holocaust in France. An active Resistance fought against the occupying forces throughout the war. Southern France was administered by a puppet government under Philippe Pétain in Vichy, known therefore as Vichy France. In opposition, Charles de Gaulle led Free France, a government-in-exile in London with control over France's unoccupied overseas territories and forces which fought on the Allied side.

The Liberation of France began with the Allied invasions of 1944, Operation Overlord at Normandy in the north and Operation Dragoon in the south. Allied forces achieved the Liberation of Paris in August. De Gaulle established the Provisional Government of the French Republic, and the entire country returned to the Allies. Further fighting occurred in France during the advance to the Rhine of 1944–1945. After the war, France became a founding member of NATO, and a permanent member of the United Nations Security Council.

=== Vichy France ===
The Vichy regime remained officially neutral during the conflict but collaborated with Germany. Prime Minister Pierre Laval repeatedly sought to bring France closer to the Axis side but was vetoed by Pétain. On several occasions, Vichy forces were attacked by British and Free French forces, especially in French Africa. As a result of Vichy North Africa violating the terms of the 1940 armistice by calling a cease-fire following Operation Torch, the Germans occupied all of continental France in the fall of 1942 but allowed the Vichy government to continue operating. Vichy North Africa's government and military led by François Darlan joined the Allies. After Darlan was assassinated, de Gaulle took power alongside Henri Giraud. Laval was executed for high treason after the war. Pétain was sentenced to death but his sentence was commuted.

=== Free France ===
The Free French Forces (FFF) of the French Committee of National Liberation (CFLN), a London-based exile group led by Charles de Gaulle, were formed in 1940 to maintain the French commitment to the Allies and liberate French territory occupied by Germany. Together with the French Resistance, they played a part in the Mediterranean Theatre and the liberation of western Europe, including France in 1944. By 1943, free France controlled large territories but had no war industry, remaining dependent on US aid. It regrouped with the Vichy authority that joined it and the interior resistance into fighting France. The CFLN took control of France in August and September 1944.

In 1944, FFF soldiers numbered about 560,000 and in 1945, more than 1,300,000. The Resistance (forces of the interior), according to D. E. Eisenhower, played a role equal to 15 fighting divisions. The FFF and Resistance played a major role during the liberation of France.

=== French Equatorial Africa ===
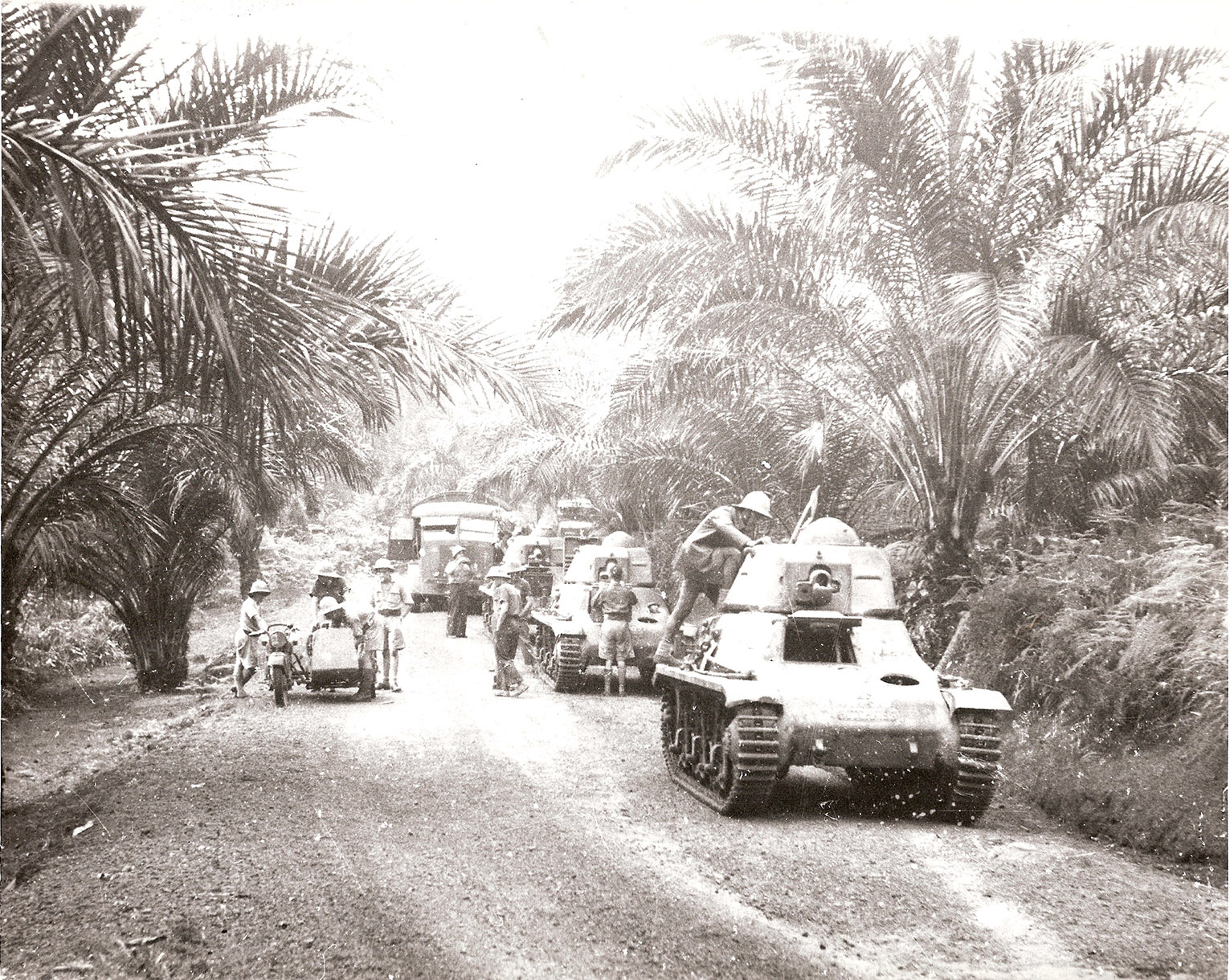
Free French tanks during the Battle of Gabon, November 1940

The colonial federation rallied to the Free French Forces under Félix Éboué in August 1940, except for Gabon which was Vichy French until 12 November 1940, when the Vichy administration surrendered to invading Free French in the Battle of Gabon. Afterward, the federation became the strategic centre of Free French activities in Africa, with the city of Brazzaville serving as the capital of Free France from 1940 to 1943. In 1944, Brazzaville hosted a meeting of the French resistance forces and representatives of France's African colonies. The resulting Brazzaville Declaration represented an attempt to redefine the relationship between France and its African colonies.

=== French Somaliland ===
French Somaliland, with its capital at Djibouti, was the scene of skirmishing and a blockade during the East African campaign of World War II. After Italy declared war on France on 10 June 1940, there was some fighting between their forces in Somaliland until the fall of France and the Franco-Italian Armistice on 25 June. The local conseil d'administration declared for the Vichy government on 19 July. Italy occupied the French fort at Loyada and used it as a base for its invasion of British Somaliland in August. Britain established a naval blockade and bombed Djibouti in September. In response, the new Vichy governor, Pierre Nouailhetas, instituted a brutal reign of terror against both Europeans and locals. He was recalled and forced to retire in 1942. As the blockade tightened, many French forces defected and fled to British Somaliland. This finally prompted the governor to surrender to Free French forces on 26 December 1942, the last French possession in Africa to remain loyal to Vichy. After the territory's liberation, French Somaliland cycled through governors rapidly and recovery from the deprivation of 1940–42 only began when the war ended.

=== French West Africa ===
French West Africa was not the scene of major fighting. Only one large-scale action took place there: the Battle of Dakar (23–25 September 1940). The region remained under the control of Vichy France after the fall of France (25 June 1940) and until the Allied invasion of North Africa (8–16 November 1942). French Gabon, the only colony of French Equatorial Africa not to join Free France after the armistice, fell to invading Free French Forces from the neighbouring colonies after the Battle of Gabon (8–12 November 1940), further isolating West Africa. Unlike in metropolitan France, the French Colonial Troops in West Africa were not reduced after the 1940 armistice and the region was little interfered with by the Axis powers, providing a valuable addition to the forces of Free France after it had been liberated.

== Gambia Colony and Protectorate ==
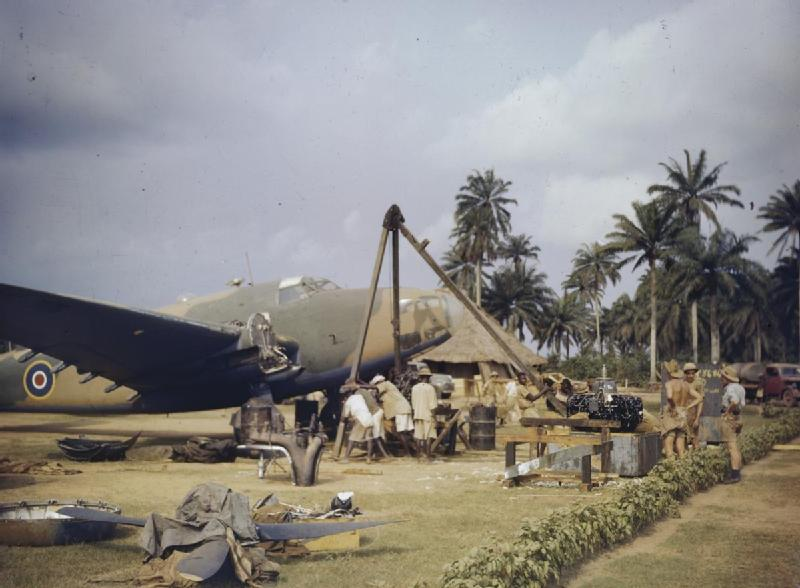
RAF fitters and local workers change an aircraft engine at a West African base, probably Yundum, 1943.

The Gambia Colony and Protectorate was ruled by Britain. In 1939 its military, the Gambia Company, was expanded into the Gambia Regiment, with a strength of two battalions from 1941. It fought in the Burma campaign. The colony also formed an Auxiliary Police, who, among other things, helped to enforce blackouts in Bathurst. The Gambia itself was home to RAF Bathurst, a flying boat base, and RAF Yundum, an air force station, which became the country's first airport. HMS Melampus, a shore base, was based at Bathurst for some of the war, and in 1942, a light cruiser named HMS Gambia was launched, which maintained ties to the colony until it was decommissioned in 1960. The Gambia was home to a succession of wartime British General Hospitals. In 1943, Franklin D. Roosevelt stopped overnight in Bathurst en route to and from the Casablanca Conference. This marked the first visit to the African continent by a sitting US president. After the war, attention turned to economic and political reform in the colony, such as decreasing its reliance on the groundnut, which made up almost 100% of its exports.

== Germany ==
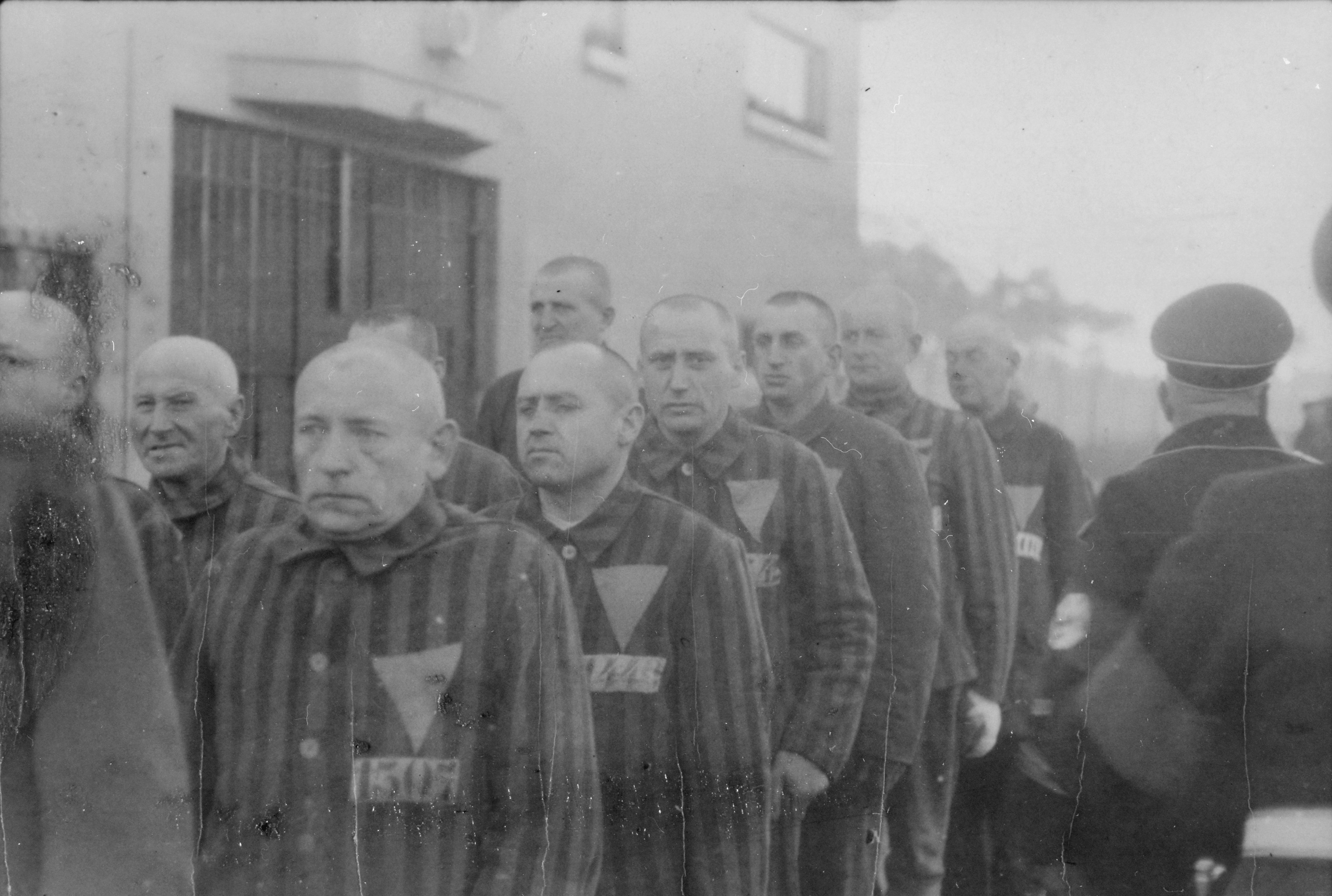
Prisoners in Sachsenhausen concentration camp, 1938

Nazi Germany, led by Adolf Hitler, was the primary Axis Power in the European Theatre. German forces instigated the war in September 1939 by invading Poland. Poland was divided with the Soviet Union. The Phoney War ensued and in the spring of 1940 German forces invaded and conquered Denmark, Norway, France, Belgium, Luxembourg, and the Netherlands. Attempts to subdue the United Kingdom by air in the summer of 1940 failed and a planned invasion was called off. In the summer of 1941 Germany turned its forces east by invading the Soviet Union. The Eastern Front became the main theatre of war for the Germans. The invasion of the USSR had been delayed by campaigns in Greece and Yugoslavia, aimed at assisting floundering Italian forces. The Afrika Korps was similarly dispatched to the Western Desert to assist struggling Italian forces there, and German forces grew to an entire army group. Major defeats at Stalingrad in February 1943 and the destruction of Axis forces in North Africa shortly after are commonly thought to be the war's turning points. German forces fought on Sicily, and when Italy switched sides, German forces seized power, fighting a successful withdrawal and diverting Allied forces from Northwest Europe. Severe losses at Kursk in the summer of 1943 and during the Soviet summer offensives of 1944 shattered German fighting power, and Allied landings in Normandy and Southern France forced the Germans to fight on several fronts simultaneously. The surrender of the German forces between 4 May and 8 May 1945 signaled the end of the war in Europe.

German forces were very active at sea, primarily through its submarine force. The German air force provided effective tactical and logistical support until Allied air superiority was achieved by the middle of 1944. Strategic use of airpower failed and despite heavy aerial bombardment (and later, the V-1 and V-2 rockets) of the United Kingdom, failed to achieve lasting results.

Hitler's war aims included the destruction of the Jews of Europe, and at the Wannsee Conference in early 1942, a system of extermination was finalized which led to the Holocaust.

=== Austria ===
Austria became a full part of Nazi Germany in 1938 among popular acclaim during the Anschluss. About 1.2 million Austrians served in all branches of the German armed forces during World War II. After the defeat of the Axis Powers, the Allies occupied Austria in four occupation zones set up at the end of World War II until 1955, when the country again became a fully independent republic under the condition that it remained neutral. The four occupations zones were French, American, British, and Soviet, with Vienna also divided among the four powers. This paralleled the situation in post-war Germany.

== Gibraltar ==
The British overseas territory of Gibraltar has been a British fortress and bulwark for over 300 years. From the first days of World War II, the Rock became a pivot of the Mediterranean; Operation Torch, the invasion of North Africa, was coordinated from the Rock. Operation Tracer, a top-secret mission in which six men were to be concealed inside a secret bunker inside the Rock of Gibraltar so that they could monitor enemy movements if the Rock was captured was also conducted through Gibraltar.

== Gold Coast (Ghana) ==
Colonial troops from the Gold Coast Colony played an important role in the East African campaign, particularly in attacking Italian-controlled Ethiopia. Accra, the capital, hosted Allied aircraft as they flew between the United States, Europe and the Pacific. The Gold Coast also benefited financially from the war. By 1945, increased British government spending and the introduction of an income tax led to an expansion of local revenue. The war changed the demographics of the colony, concentrating workers in a few large towns and cities. The colonial government launched a program to deal with a housing shortage by constructing inexpensive but sturdy local building material (an earthquake in 1939 had badly damaged infrastructure in many towns).

== Greece ==
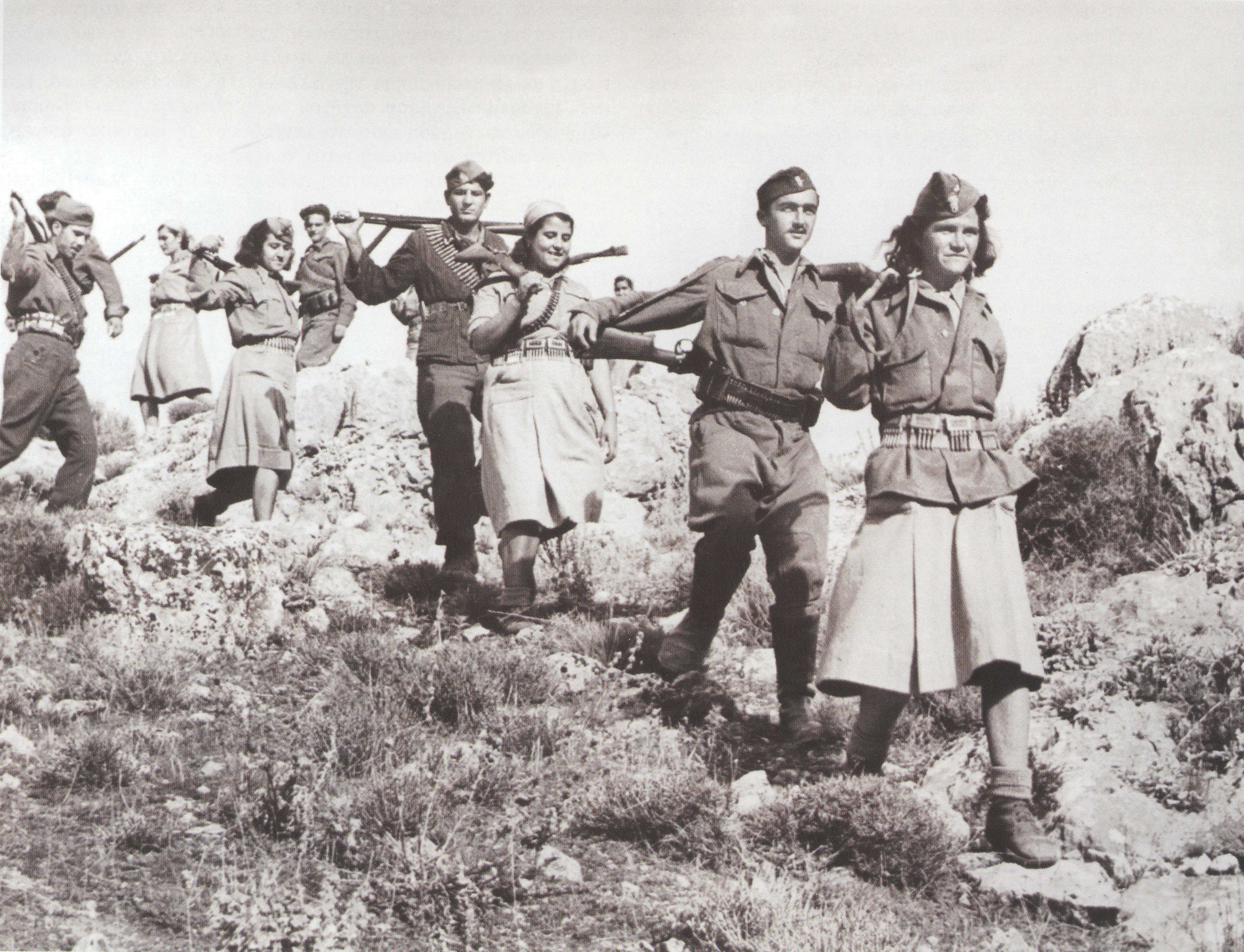
Partisans of the Greek People's Liberation Army

Greece initially resisted the Italian invasion of 28 October 1940 and pushed Mussolini's forces back into Albania. Hitler reluctantly sent forces to bail out his ally and subdue Greece (Operation Marita). The resulting Battle of Greece in April 1941 delayed the invasion of the Soviet Union, and the heavy losses of the German Fallschirmjäger over Crete effectively put a halt to large-scale German airborne operations.

The government and the King fled the country to Egypt, from where they continued the fight. The occupation forces installed a series of puppet governments, which commanded little allegiance. A vigorous Resistance movement developed from 1942 on, dominated largely by the communist-led National Liberation Front (EAM) and the non-communist National Republican Greek League (EDES).

Throughout 1943, the guerrillas liberated much of the country's mountainous interior, establishing a free zone called "Free Greece". After the Italian capitulation in September 1943, the Germans took over the Italian zone, often accompanied by bloodshed, as the Italians tried to resist both them and the Allies trying to occupy Italian-held areas (the Dodecanese campaign). As Liberation approached, the Resistance became divided along political lines, and civil strife ensued. An agreement establishing a national unity government was reached in the May 1944 Lebanon conference, which eased tension somewhat.

With the advance of the Red Army through Eastern Europe in summer 1944, the German forces withdrew from the Greek mainland in October–November 1944, although many island garrisons were left behind and surrendered after the unconditional surrender on 8 May 1945. The returning government in exile, backed by British forces, soon clashed with EAM forces in Athens, beginning the Greek Civil War; a conflict that would last until 1949 and leave a divisive legacy.

== Guatemala ==
Guatemala initially stayed out of World War II, with President Jorge Ubico declaring the country's neutrality on 4 September 1941. This pronouncement was reinforced five days later with another declaration. Ubico implemented strong prohibitions on Nazi propaganda in Guatemala, which had one of Central America's largest German immigrant populations. Later, Guatemala moved into the Allied camp—on 9 December 1941, it declared war on Japan, and three days later, it declared war on Germany and Italy. Ubico permitted the United States to build an air base in the country.

Unrest in Guatemala grew during the war years, culminating in the outbreak of the Guatemalan Revolution in June 1944. Ubico resigned in June following a general strike, and the new dictator that replaced him fell to a democratic popular revolution in October. The philosopher Juan José Arévalo won a presidential election held that December; he led Guatemala for the remainder of the war period.

== Haiti ==
Haiti remained neutral in World War II until the bombing of Pearl Harbor. Thus, in late 1941, Haiti declared war on Japan (8 December), Germany (12 December), Italy (12 December), Bulgaria (24 December), Hungary (24 December) and Romania (24 December). Out of these six Axis countries, only Romania reciprocated, declaring war on Haiti on the same day (24 December 1941). Haiti gave food supplies to Allied forces and hosted a detachment of the United States Coast Guard but did not contribute troops, however five Haitians from the Haitian Air Force were integrated into the U.S. army (Tuskegee Airmen division) and fought in the war. The President of Haiti, Élie Lescot, introduced several unpopular emergency measures during the war, which critics claimed were designed to increase his power. Lescot was deposed the year after the war ended.

== Honduras ==
Honduras was initially neutral in the war but joined the Allied side after the attack on Pearl Harbor. It declared war on Japan on 8 December 1941, and on Germany and Italy four days later. It contributed food and raw materials to the Allied war effort and did send troops, of whom 150 died. Due to this, the country began a series of air patrols using NA-16 model aircraft starting in 1942. German submarines also sank three Honduran ships throughout the war and one was captured by the Japanese navy. In addition to patrolling Honduran territory, Honduran airmen also flew in the vicinity of the Gulf of Mexico in joint support with other Latin American nations to prevent more ships destined for the United States from sinking Since they were a big producer of bananas, they've also sent thousands of bananas to the allied forces.

== Hong Kong ==
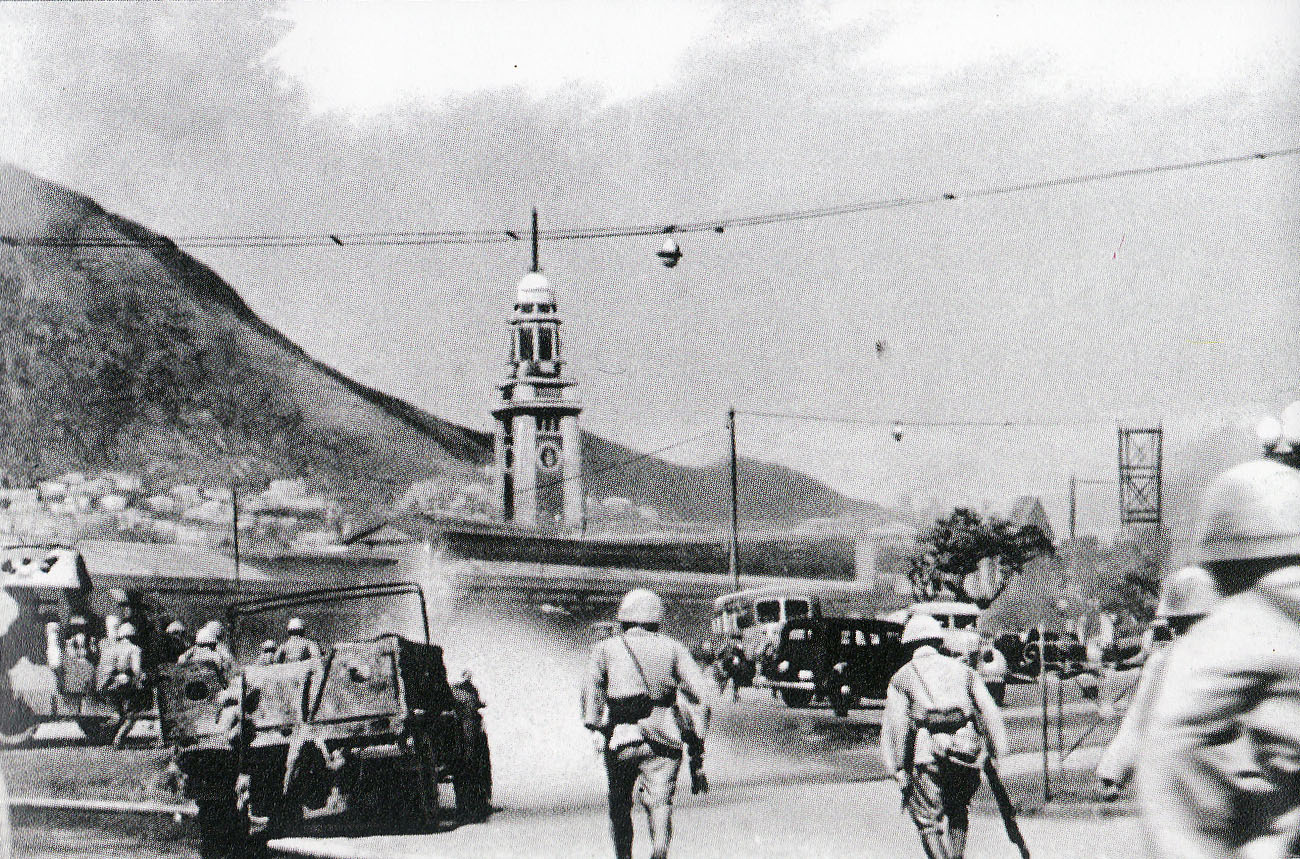
Japanese troops in Tsim Sha Tsui

Hong Kong had been a British colony for a century. Japan occupied the city after the grueling Battle of Hong Kong, which ended on Christmas Day of 1941. The Japanese turned many healthcare facilities into field hospitals to help injured soldiers returning from the Pacific theater. Strict food rations were also enforced, and to keep the rations low, many citizens were deported to China. By the end of the war Hong Kong's population had fallen from 1,500,000 to a mere 600,000. The United States Navy carried out air raids on Hong Kong for three years while the Royal Australian Navy lay mines nearby, but the city remained in Japanese hands until after the Surrender of Japan in 1945. A group of cruisers led by HMS Swiftsure arrived at Hong Kong on 30 August to retake it for Britain; the Japanese formally surrendered on 16 September.

== Hungary ==
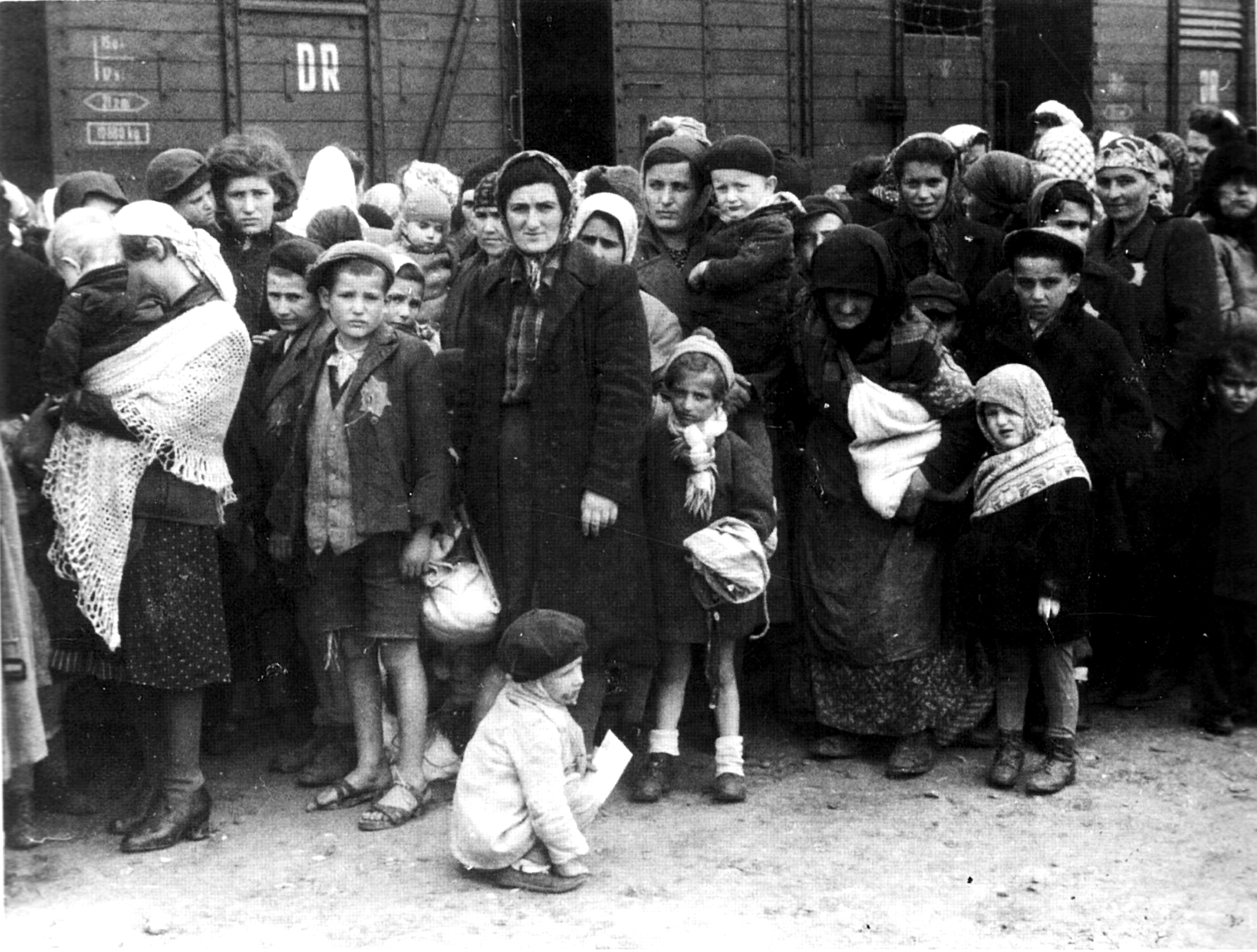
Hungarian Jewish women and children after their arrival at Auschwitz death camp, 1944

Hungary was a significant German ally. It signed the Tripartite Pact on 20 November 1940, and joined in the invasion of the Soviet Union the next year. When, in 1944, the government of Regent Miklós Horthy wished to sign a ceasefire with the Allies, he was overthrown by the Nazis and replaced by a government run by the Hungarist Arrow Cross movement, which ruled the country until it was overrun by the Soviets in 1945.

== Iceland ==
Iceland was a free state at the outbreak of war in personal union with the King of Denmark acting as head of state. After the German invasion of Denmark (1940), Iceland lost all contact with the King. British forces invaded Iceland on 10 May 1940, to secure bases for themselves and to deny Germany the same option. A small armed force was present, but obeyed orders not to resist the British. The British proceeded to arrest a number of German nationals, including the German consul, Werner Gerlach, and seize radio and telephone services.

Iceland's government formally protested the occupation, but provided the British with de facto cooperation. During the height of the occupation, 25,000 British soldiers were stationed in Iceland, compared to roughly 40,000 inhabitants of Reykjavík. On 7 July 1941, control of Iceland was transferred from Britain to the USA. The U.S. was not yet at war, but Iceland needed to be denied to the Germans.

Iceland experienced an economic boom during the occupation, since many Icelanders took jobs working for the foreigners, and some say that bretavinnan (roughly, the British Jobs) provided some of the successes of the post-war Icelandic economy. On 17 June 1944, with American encouragement, Iceland became a permanently independent republic, and it cut all ties with Denmark. Despite being occupied, Iceland remained officially neutral throughout the duration of the Second World War. Icelandic air bases such as at Keflavík were important to the Allied fight against the German U-boats in the Battle of the Atlantic.

With its small population, Iceland was in no position to raise any armed forces. The close cooperation between the Americans and the Icelanders led to Iceland's giving up neutrality and becoming a charter member of the North Atlantic Treaty Organization (NATO) in 1949. Iceland has not had any armed forces (but see Cod Wars), but its contribution was bases for its allies: the American Air Force Base and Naval Air Station at Keflavík.

== India ==
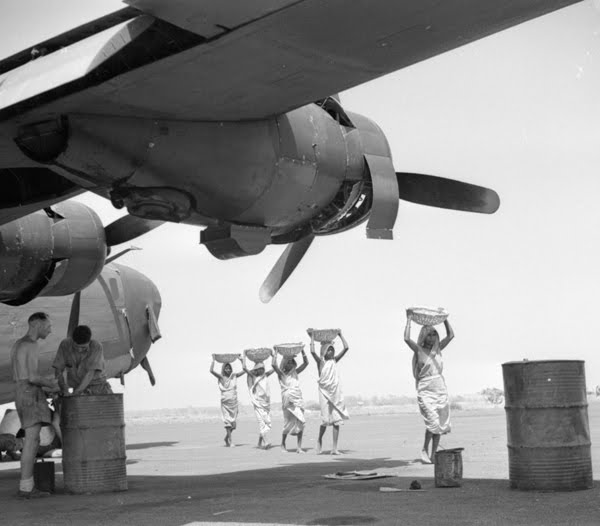
Indian women labourers pass mechanics at an RAF base in Bengal, 1944.

The Indian Empire consisted of the present day territory of India, Pakistan, and Bangladesh; Burma had become a separate colony in 1937, though unofficially the Persian Gulf Residency was included. As part of the British Empire, India was covered by Britain's declaration of war. Two and a half million Indian soldiers fought under British command with the Indian Army, Royal Indian Air Force, and Royal Indian Navy, forming the largest army raised by voluntary enlistment. Around 87,000 Indian members of the armed forces were killed in action, and another 64,000 were wounded. Many Indian personnel received awards for gallantry, including 30 Victoria Crosses during the 1940s.

The labour of millions more Indians contributed to the Allied war effort. Poor working conditions and accidents such as the 1944 Bombay explosion claimed many lives. Strategically, India provided the base for American operations in support of China in the China Burma India Theater. Supplies flowed from India to China overland along the Ledo Road and by air over the Hump. Cities on India's eastern coast were menaced by Japanese air raids; Calcutta and Chittagong, for instance, was bombed several times. In 1944, Japanese forces invaded eastern India, suffering devastating losses from disease, malnutrition, and exhaustion.

An estimated 2.1–3 million, out of a population of 60.3 million, died of starvation, malaria and other diseases aggravated by malnutrition, population displacement, unsanitary conditions and lack of health care. Historians have frequently characterized the famine as "man-made", asserting that wartime colonial policies created and then exacerbated the crisis.

While large sectors of Indian society lent their support to the war, including the Muslim League, Indians were far from unanimous in their support. The Cripps Mission of 1942 failed to win support of the Indian National Congress for the war effort and future Dominion status. Instead, Congress, led by Mohandas Gandhi, demanded independence in the Quit India Movement. In response, Gandhi and most of the Congress leadership were arrested. Meanwhile, Subhas Chandra Bose led a nationalist movement that sought to use World War II as an opportunity to fight the British. Bose's movement spawned a government in exile, called Azad Hind, and military units that fought with the Axis: the Indian National Army in Southeast Asia and the Indian Legion in Europe.

=== Andaman and Nicobar Islands ===
On 23 March 1942, Japanese forces invaded the Andaman and Nicobar Islands. In December 1943, the Japanese-sponsored Free India Movement (Azad Hind) was formed. The Andaman Islands were renamed Shaheed Islands, and the Nicobars were renamed Swaraj Islands. Andaman & Nicobar Islanders fought alongside the Japanese during this time. The islands were not reoccupied by the British until 6 October 1945.

== Indochina ==
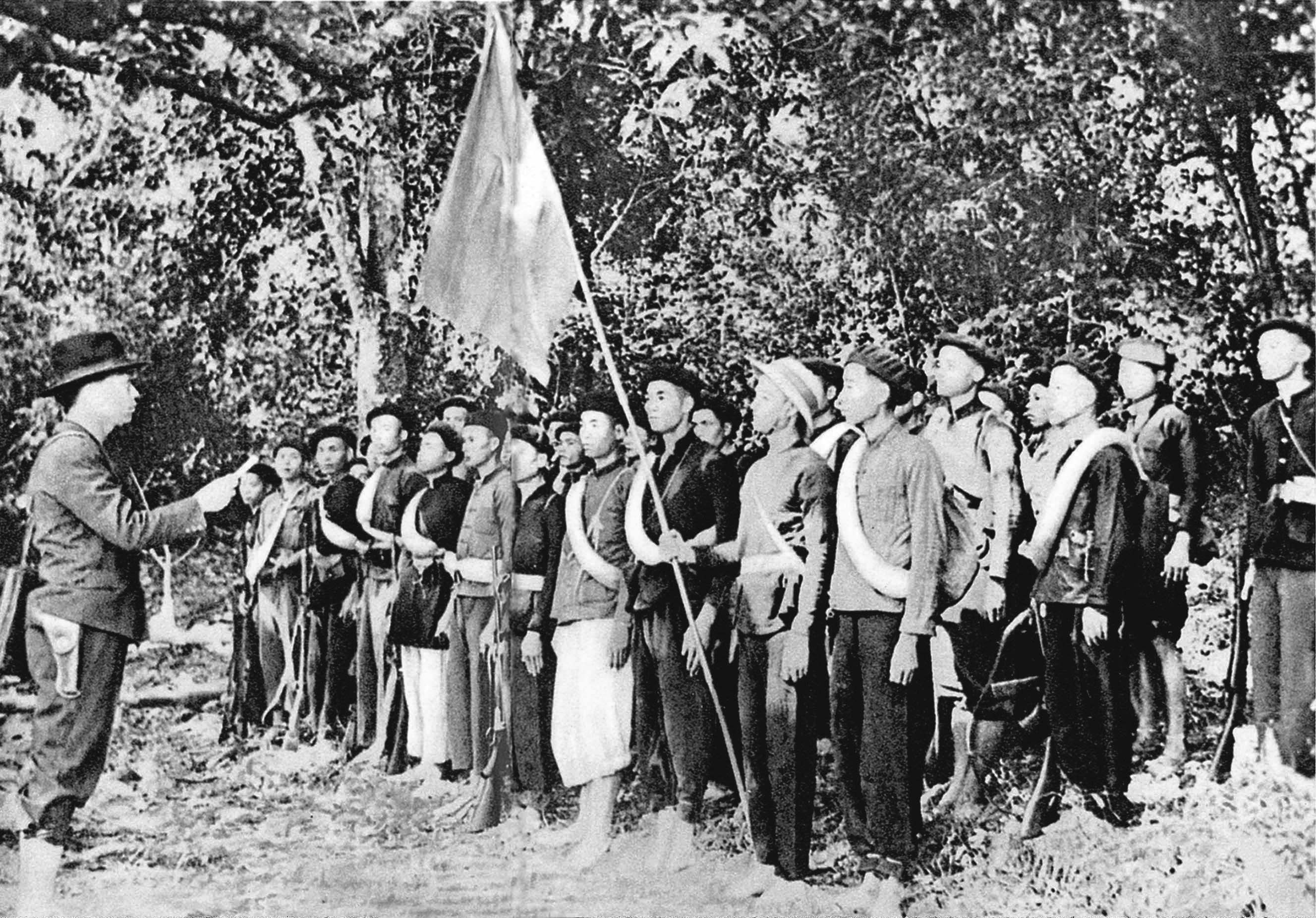
Võ Nguyên Giáp addresses Viet Minh forces in the jungle, 1944.

After the Battle of France and the fall of the French Third Republic, the colonial administration of Indochina (modern-day Vietnam, Laos and Cambodia) passed to Vichy France. In September 1940 Japanese troops entered parts of Indochina; in July 1941 Japan occupied the entire territory. Thailand took this opportunity to reclaim previously lost territories, resulting in the Franco-Thai War between October 1940 and May 1941. Japan used Indochina to launch part of its invasion of Malaya; this and attacks on Pearl Harbor and other British and American territories sparked the Pacific War, bringing World War II to Indochina.

During the Japanese occupation, Indochinese communists established a base in Cao Bằng Province, but most of the resistance to Japan and Vichy France, including both communist and non-communist groups, remained based over the border in the Republic of China. China released Ho Chi Minh from jail in 1941; with the aid of Western intelligence services, he revived the Việt Minh to fight the Japanese occupation.

The Liberation of Paris in 1944 ended the Vichy regime. The new Provisional Government of the French Republic joined the Allies, and its administration in Indochina began to give covert support to Allied operations in the Pacific. Therefore, on 9 March 1945, Japan launched a coup d'état to oust the French administration. Vietnam, Cambodia and Laos became nominally independent members of Japan's Greater East Asia Co-Prosperity Sphere: the Empire of Vietnam, Kingdom of Kampuchea, and Kingdom of Laos. In reality, the Japanese were in control of Indochina until the news of their government's surrender came in August. The general disorganization of Indochina, coupled with several natural disasters, led to the Vietnamese Famine of 1945. The Việt Minh staged the August Revolution and issued a proclamation of independence at the war's end. The French took back control of the country in 1945–1946, but the First Indochina War that began that December would bring an end to French rule.

=== Laos ===
In 1945 the Japanese occupied Vientiane in April. King Sīsavāngvong was allowed to keep his throne, but his son Crown Prince Savāngvatthanā called on all Laotians to resist the occupiers. Prince Phetxarāt opposed this position, and thought that Lao independence could be gained by siding with the Japanese, who made him Prime Minister of Luang Phrabāng, though not of Laos as a whole. In practice the country was in chaos and Phetxarāt's government had no real authority. Another Lao group, the Lao Issara (Free Lao), received unofficial support from the Free Thai movement in the Isan region. Thailand re-annexed a small portion of Laos following the conclusion of the French–Thai War in 1941. The territories were only returned to French sovereignty in October 1946.

== Iran ==
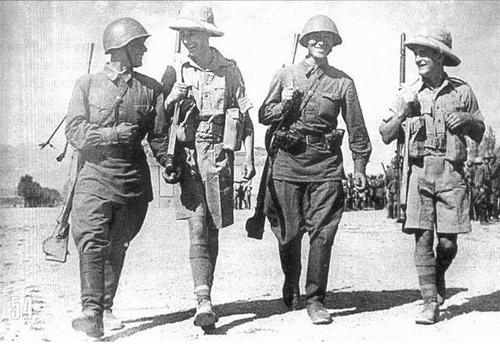
Soviet and British soldiers in Iran, following the Anglo-Soviet invasion, August 1941

During the start of the war the Allies demanded that Iran remove German nationals from their soil, fearing they might be Nazi spies or harm the British-owned oil facilities, but Reza Shah refused, stating that they had nothing to do with the Nazis.

The Allies worried that Germany would look to neutral Iran for oil. Soon the Allies questioned themselves about Iranian neutrality and they gave Reza Shah a final warning to remove the German workers. He refused once again. In August 1941, the British and Soviet troops invaded Iran (Operation Countenance) and, in September 1941, forced Reza Shah Pahlavi to abdicate his throne. He was replaced by his son Mohammad Reza Shah Pahlavi, who was willing to enter the war on the side of the Allies. Iran became known as "The Bridge of Victory".

Iran provided a 'blue water' supply route to the Soviet Union via the port of Bandar Abbas and a specially constructed railway route. The supply routes were known collectively as the Persian Corridor. Soviet political operatives known as "agitprops" infiltrated Iran and helped establish the Comintern affiliate Tudeh Party in early 1942.

In September 1943, Iran declared war on Germany, which qualified it for membership in the United Nations (UN).

The Soviet Union fomented revolts among the Azerbaijani and Kurdish peoples in Iran and soon formed the People's Republic of Azerbaijan in December 1945 and the Kurdish People's Republic not long after. Both were run by Soviet-controlled leaders. Soviet troops remained in Iran, following the January 1946 expiration of a wartime treaty providing for the presence of American, British and Soviet troops.

== Iraq ==
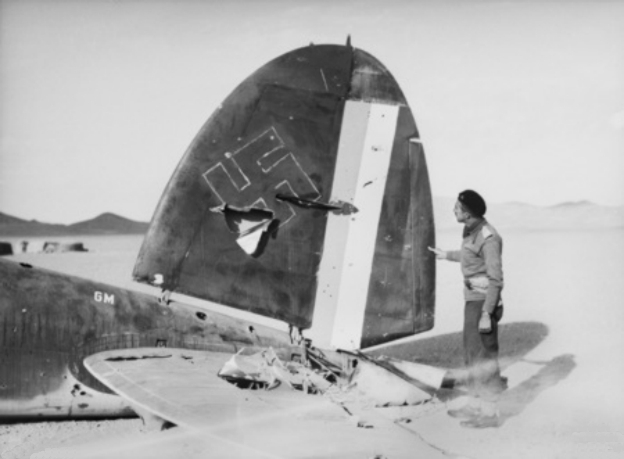
Tail of a downed bomber with Iraqi and Nazi German markings, Syria, December 1941

Iraq was important to Britain due to its position on a route to India and the strategic oil supplies that it provided. Since the end of the First World War, these were protected by a significant Royal Air Force base at Habbaniyah and by maintaining sympathetic governments. Because of the United Kingdom's weakness early in the war, Iraq backed away from the Anglo-Iraqi alliance. When the British High Command requested to send reinforcements to Iraq, the country's Prime Minister, Nuri al-Said, allowed a small British force to land. Consequently, he was forced to resign after a pro-Axis coup under Rashid Ali in April 1941. Later British requests to reinforce Iraq were denied by the new leadership.

The new regime secretly began negotiations with the Axis powers. The Germans and Italians responded quickly and sent military aid by Luftwaffe aircraft to Baghdad via Syria. Indian troops consequently invaded in late April 1941 and reached Baghdad and RAF Habbaniyah in May. The Iraqi army attacked Habbaniyah but quickly capitulated and Rashid Ali fled the country. The United Kingdom urged Iraq to declare war on the Axis in 1942. British forces remained to protect the vital oil supplies. Iraq declared war on the Axis powers in 1943 after cutting diplomatic ties. Germany initially refused to accept the declaration, as they still recognised Rashid Ali as the legitimate government. The Iraqi army played a role in protecting the logistic routes of the Allies, especially the military aids to the Soviet Union which used to arrive from Basra, Baghdad and Kirkuk. British and Indian operations in Iraq should be viewed in conjunction with events in neighbouring Syria and Persia.

== Ireland ==
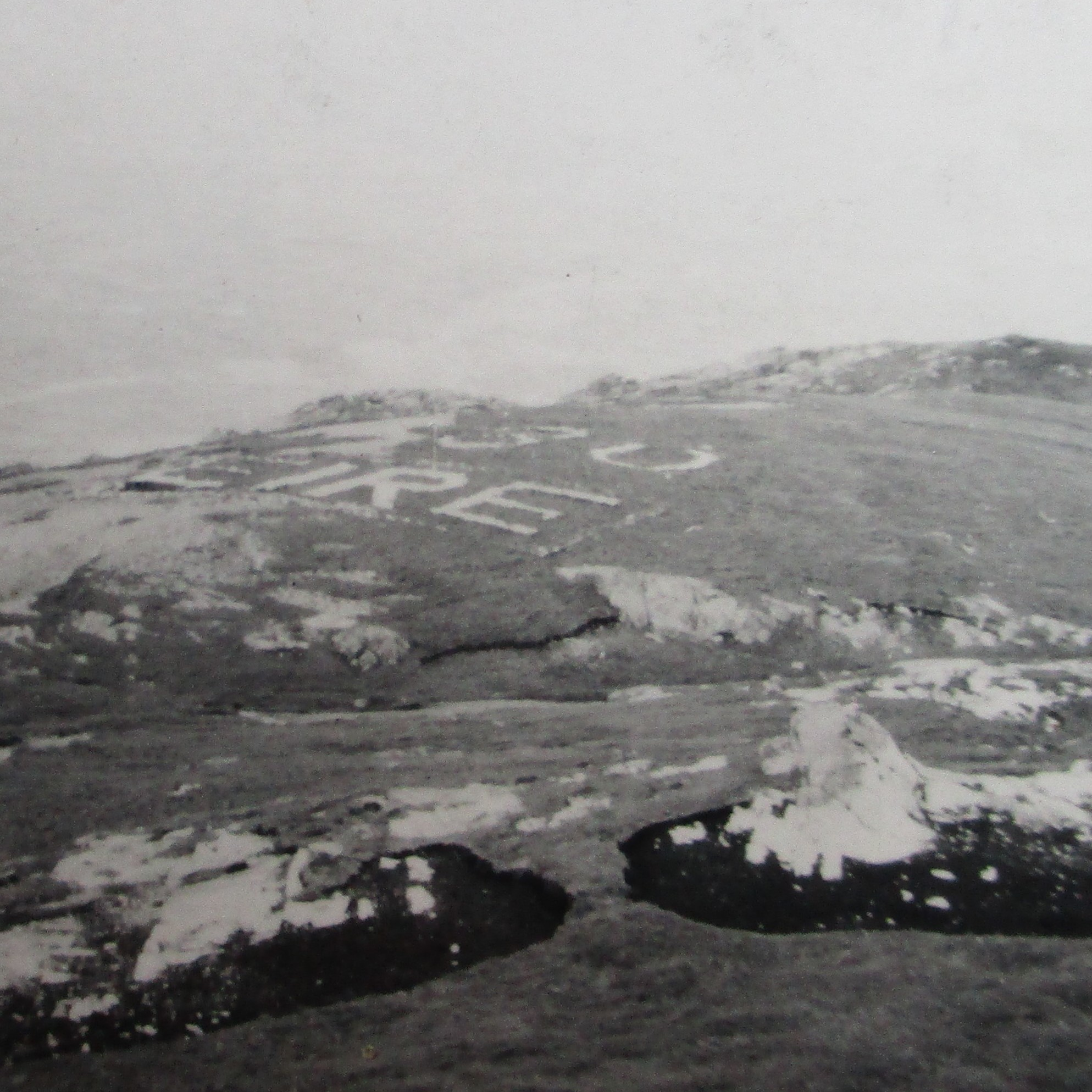
An EIRE sign placed on the coast to warn aircraft that they were in the airspace of neutral Ireland

Ireland remained neutral throughout the war. Irish citizens were free to work abroad and join foreign militaries. By the end of the war, figures suggest that 70,000 men and women born in the State served in the British armed forces, although this estimate has risen considerably over the years. One Irishman, Paddy Finucane, the youngest wing commander and fighter ace in the Royal Air Force's history, before the age of 22 achieved one of the highest kill rates in the Battle of Britain and in offensive operations over France.

Some civilians were killed in the Bombing of Dublin in World War II and County Carlow in apparently-accidental bombings by the Luftwaffe. The bombings have been cited as the result of either deliberate attacks, errors in navigation or British electronic countermeasures against the Luftwaffe. It was established much later that the Luftwaffe bombed Dublin's North Strand district as part of Operation Roman Helmet, an operation carried out in retribution for Ireland's breaches of neutrality which included Eamon DeValera's decision to send fire engines across the border to assist in fighting fires in the Belfast blitz.

In June 1940 British Major General Bernard Montgomery was tasked to make plans to invade Ireland in order to seize Cork and Cobh. Winston Churchill also made plans to invade to take the three former Treaty Ports. The decision to go ahead with the D-day landings was decided by an Atlantic Ocean weather report from Blacksod Lighthouse, County Mayo Ireland.

== Italy ==
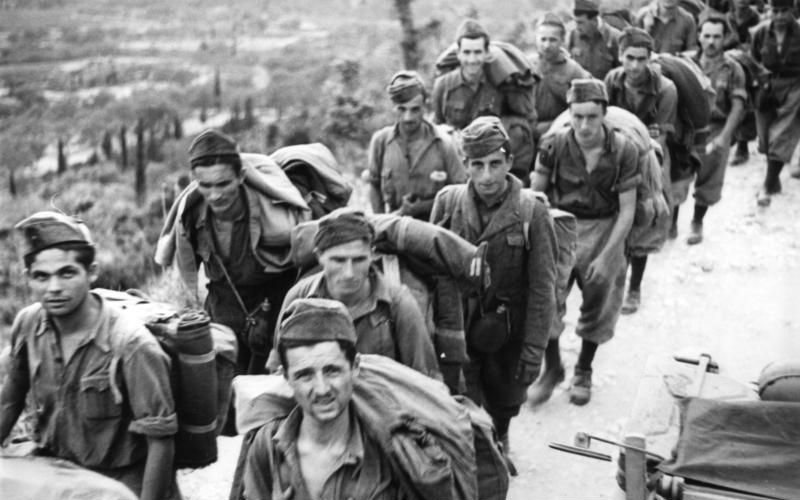
Italian soldiers taken prisoner by the Germans on Corfu in the wake of the Massacre of the Acqui Division, September 1943

Fascist Italy had completed conquests (Ethiopia and Albania) prior to its entry into World War II. After the initially successful campaigns of Nazi Germany, Italy joined in the war in June 1940, planning to get a share of Allied territory with the defeat of France.

The Italians bombed Mandatory Palestine, invaded Egypt and occupied British Somaliland with initial success. A friendly Fascist regime had been installed in Spain, and a puppet regime installed in Croatia following the Invasion of Yugoslavia. Albania, Ljubljana, coastal Dalmatia, and Montenegro had been directly annexed into the Italian state. Most of Greece had been occupied by Italy (despite initial defeat), as had the French territories of Corsica and Tunisia following Vichy France's collapse and Case Anton. However, after the German-Italian defeat in Africa and Eastern Front, the Allies started to invade Italy in the summer of 1943 and Mussolini's government collapsed.

The new royal government of Marshal Pietro Badoglio signed an armistice with the allies, but most of the country was quickly occupied by the Germans, who established a puppet government under Mussolini in the north, the Italian Social Republic (also known as the Salò Republic, from its headquarters). Badoglio and King Victor Emmanuel III escaped to Brindisi without giving any order to the army, which was left in chaos and without leadership: some divisions surrendered to the Germans, others fought back on their own.

The royal government remained in control of the south and declared war on Germany; the military forces it still controlled joined the Allies in a position of co-belligerence. It was eventually re-established as the government of all of Italy shortly before the end of the war in the spring of 1945, when partisan uprisings liberated northern Italy. Italy would become a member of NATO after the war, but lost the region of Istria and the Dalmatian city of Zadar to Yugoslavia, and all its colonies excluding Somalia.

=== Italian East Africa ===
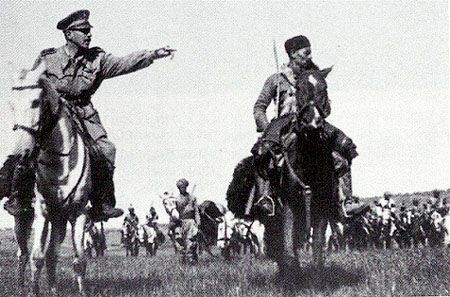
Italian Lieutenant Amedeo Guillet, a Libyan Spahi, and his Gruppo Bande Amhara, 1940. (Note: "The cavalry of the Gruppo Bande were recruited for all over Ethiopia and were Amharic speaking, hence the name. But the NCOs were Eritrean, and the officers were Italians, hand-picked by Amedeo himself" Along with this, the unit contained Yemeni infantry)

Benito Mussolini had formed Italian East Africa in 1936 by merging recently conquered Ethiopia with the older colonies of Eritrea and Somaliland. On 10 June 1940, Mussolini declared war on Britain and France, which made Italian military forces in East Africa a danger to the bordering British and French colonies. The Comando Supremo (Italian General Staff) had planned for a war after 1942; in the summer of 1940 Italy was not ready for a long war or for the occupation of large areas of Africa.

The East African campaign began on 13 June 1940 with an Italian air raid on a British air base at Wajir in Kenya. To mount their counterattack, the Allies assembled a largely multi-African force that included Ethiopians, Eritreans, soldiers from Britain's African colonies and from India, and soldiers of the Congolese Force Publique fighting for Free Belgium. The campaign continued until Italian forces had been pushed back from Kenya and Sudan, through Somaliland, Eritrea and Ethiopia in 1940 and early 1941. The bulk of the Italian forces still in the colony surrendered after the Battle of Gondar in November 1941, but small groups kept fighting a guerrilla war in Ethiopia until the Armistice of Cassibile in September 1943. The East African campaign was the first Allied strategic victory in the war.

After the campaign, the victorious Allies dismantled Italian East Africa. The Anglo-Ethiopian Agreement restored Haile Selassie to the Ethiopian throne (see the section on Ethiopia). Somaliland and Eritrea were placed under British military administration. In 1945, during the Potsdam Conference, the United Nations granted Italy trusteeship of Italian Somaliland under close supervision, on condition that Somalia achieve independence within ten years. In 1950 Eritrea was ceded to Ethiopia. Both British and Italian Somaliland became independent in 1960 soon after united as the Somali Republic.

== Japan ==
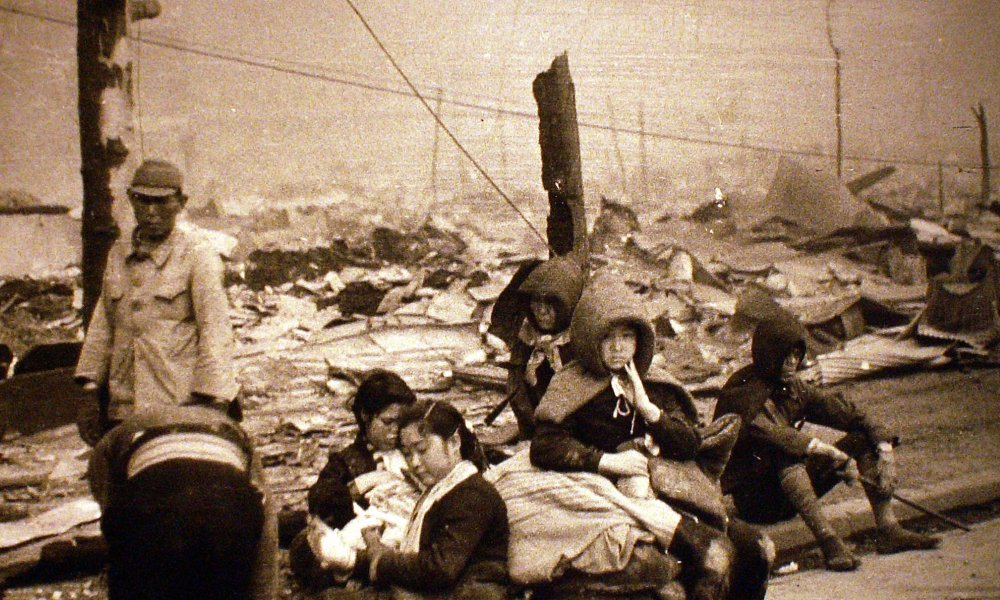
Survivors of the Bombing of Tokyo in 1945

The Empire of Japan was the leader of the Axis powers in the Pacific Theatre. Some scholars consider the outbreak of the Second Sino-Japanese War, which began when Japan invaded China after the Marco Polo Bridge incident in 1937, to be the true beginning of World War II. This conflict merged with the world war following Japan's attack on Pearl Harbor in December 1941, which was immediately followed by a series of coordinated attacks on the U.S.-held Philippines, Guam and Wake Island; on the British colonies of Malaya, Singapore, and Hong Kong; and on the Kingdom of Thailand. During 1942 Japan launched offensives in the China, Southeast Asian, and Pacific Theatres of the war. By late 1942 Japan was on the defensive as the Allies reversed its earlier gains. The Atomic bombings of Hiroshima and Nagasaki by the United States convinced the Japanese government to surrender unconditionally on September 2, 1945. Many political and military leaders from Japan were convicted for war crimes before the Tokyo tribunal and other Allied tribunals in Asia.

== Kenya ==
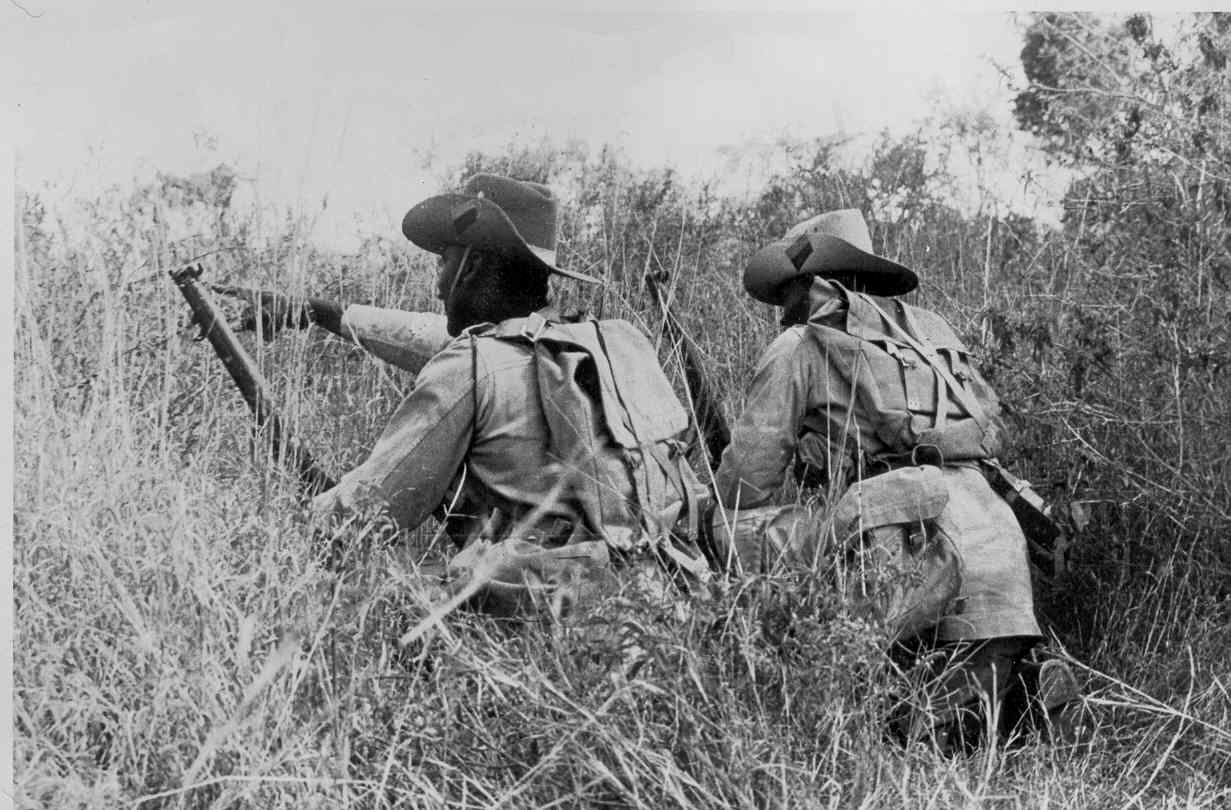
KAR soldiers train in Kenya, 1944.

During the war, Kenya was one of the most important conscription grounds for the British Army in Africa. During the course of the war, 98,240 Kenyans were enlisted as Askaris into the King's African Rifles (KAR), representing 30% of the unit's total strength. The soldiers from Kenya, of whom most were conscripted, were overwhelmingly African, and the policy of racial segregation in the British Army meant that they were commanded by white officers and NCOs. Black people were not able to rise above the rank of Warrant Officer. Kenyan soldiers served in the successful East African campaign against the Italians, as well as the invasion of Vichy-held Madagascar and the Burma campaign against the Japanese, alongside troops from west Africa. Individual Kenyans also served in the Royal Navy and Royal Air Force.

Fighting occurred in northern Kenya as part of the Southern Front of the East African campaign. In July 1940, Italian forces advanced as far as Buna, about 100 km south of the border with Ethiopia. By early 1941, the Italians had withdrawn to the border. In January and February 1941, British forces launched an offensive across the border into southern Ethiopia.

== Korea ==
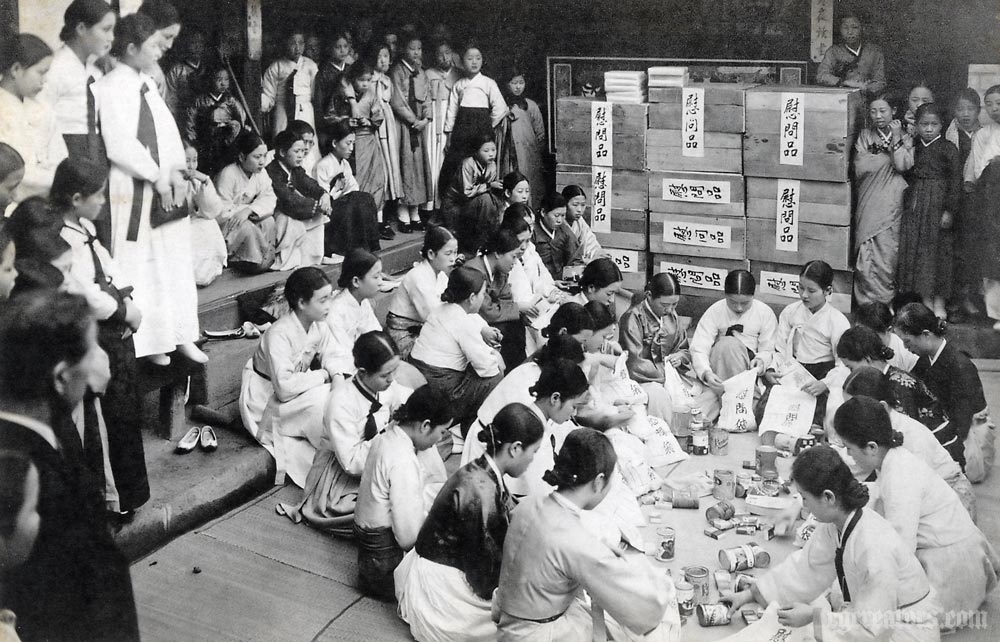
Korean women pack comfort bags to send to Korean soldiers serving in the Japanese military.

Korea was under Japanese rule as part of Japan's 50-year imperialist expansion (22 August 1910 to 15 August 1945). During World War II more than 100,000 Koreans were mandatorily drafted into the Imperial Japanese Army.

Independence movements during the colonial era included the March 1st Movement. Koreans created an official, formal government to prepare for independence. The Provisional Government of Republic of Korea was established in 1919. It created the Korean Liberation Army (KLA) on September 17, 1940, and declared war against the Empire of Japan on December 10, 1941.

The KLA failed to initiate Operation Eagle, a plan to liberate the Korean Peninsula by first attacking the capital region (Seoul and Incheon), on August 18, 1945. The Office of Strategic Services of the United States also promised to assist the KLA with warplanes, submarines, and airborne troops during the operation. However, the plan failed due to the early surrender of Japan on August 15, 1945. The Provisional Government also faced heavy oppositions against the United States military government in Korea after World War II. The government of the Republic of Korea was established on August 15, 1948, and the Provisional Government was disbanded officially.

Formally, Japanese rule ended on 2 September 1945 upon the Japanese defeat in World War II in 1945. Postwar Korea was jointly occupied by Soviet and American forces, with political disagreements leading to the separation of the peninsula into two independent nations. This eventually escalated into the Korean War.

== Latvia ==
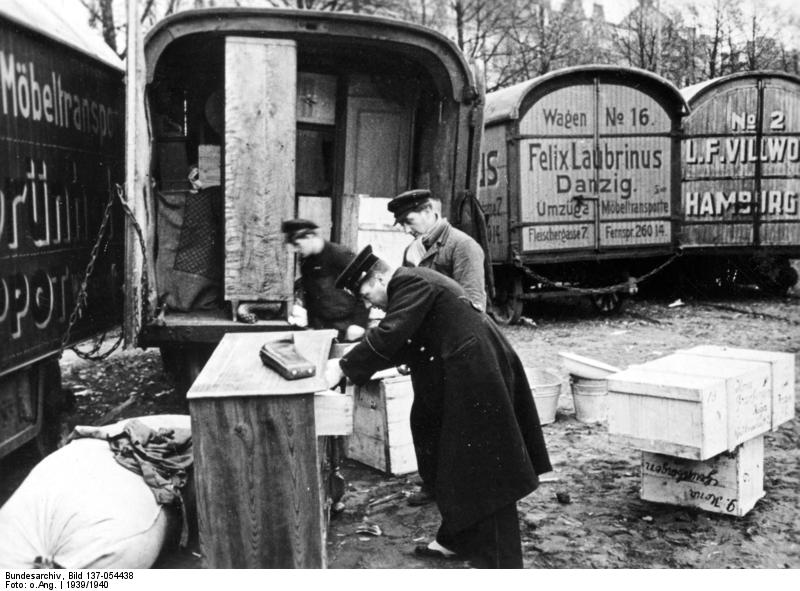
Latvian officials check items belonging to Baltic German emigrants during the Nazi–Soviet population transfers, 1939.

When the war began on September 1, 1939, Latvia declared its neutrality. After the conclusion of the Molotov–Ribbentrop Pact, Latvia was compelled by a Soviet ultimatum to accept Red Army garrisons on its territory in 1939. On 16 June 1940, the Soviet Union issued an ultimatum demanding that government be replaced and that unlimited number of Soviet troops be admitted. The government acceded to the demands, and Soviet troops occupied the country on June 17. On August 5, 1940, Latvia was annexed into the USSR. The following year, USSR security agencies "Sovietized" Latvia, resulting in the deaths of between 35,000 and 50,000 residents of Latvia. (Note: The exact figures are not known since Russia has not made the relevant documents public.) The legality of the annexation was not recognised by most Western countries and the Baltic states continued to exist as formally independent nations until 1991.

After the outbreak of German-Soviet hostilities, Soviet forces were quickly driven out by German forces. Initially, the German forces were almost universally hailed as liberators, but Nazi occupation policies gradually changed that. Riga was retaken by Soviet forces on 13 October 1944, and a major part of the German Army Group North (Heersgruppe Nord) was cut off in Kurzeme, the peninsula that forms the northwestern part of Latvia. There, they and locally raised Latvian units formed the "Kurland Fortress", which successfully held out until the end of the war in May 1945.

The first Latvian Police Battalions were formed in early 1943, and the Latvian Waffen SS Volunteer Legion on 16 March 1943. The German Occupation Government soon resorted to conscription, and Latvia became one of two countries (the other was Estonia) from where the Waffen SS soldiers were draftees. By 1 July 1944, more than 110,000 men were under arms in German-controlled units. The Latvian Legion consisted of 87,550 men, of them 31,446 serving in the 15th and 19th Waffen-Grenadier Divisions, 12,118 served in Border Guard regiments, 42,386 in various Police Forces, and 1,600 in other units. 22,744 men served in units outside the Legion such as Wehrmacht Auxiliaries and as Luftwaffenhelfer.

Approximately 70,000 Latvians (both from Latvia and the Russian SFSR) were recruited, mostly through conscription, into national units in the Red Army (Latvian Riflemen Soviet Divisions). Also, a small fleet of Latvian ships, which did not return to their home country after the start of the Soviet occupation, became a part of the Allied merchant marine while flying the Latvian flag.

Some Latvian personnel took an active part during the Holocaust, working as part of both the Soviet and the Nazi occupation governments. Attempts were made by various movements to restore an independent and democratic Latvia with ties to the Western Allies, such as the Latvian Central Council, but these efforts were thwarted by Nazi and Soviet regimes. At the end of the war, the subsequent Forest Brothers armed insurrection against the Soviet authorities lasted in the Baltic states until the mid-1950s.

== Lebanon ==
Lebanon, then under French rule, was controlled by the Vichy government after the fall of the French Third Republic. Most Lebanese people did not tolerate the Vichy government and the way it ruled, many Lebanese would mock and criticize the French soldiers for becoming Nazi Germany's ally. Lebanon was invaded and occupied by Allied forces from Palestine during the Syria–Lebanon campaign. De Gaulle declared Lebanon independent on 22 November 1943. In 1945, Lebanon declared war on Germany and Japan.

== Liberia ==
Liberia granted Allied forces access to its territory early in the war. It was used as a transit point for troops and resources bound for North Africa, particularly war supplies flown from Parnamirim (near Natal) in Brazil. Perhaps more importantly, it served as one of the Allies' only sources of rubber during the war when the plantations of Southeast Asia had been taken over by the Japanese.

The importance of this resource led to significant improvement of Liberia's transport infrastructure and a modernisation of its economy. Liberia's strategic significance was emphasised when Franklin Roosevelt, after attending the Casablanca Conference, visited Liberia and met President Edwin Barclay. Despite its assistance to the Allies, Liberia was reluctant to end its official neutrality and did not declare war on Germany until 27 January 1944.

== Libya ==
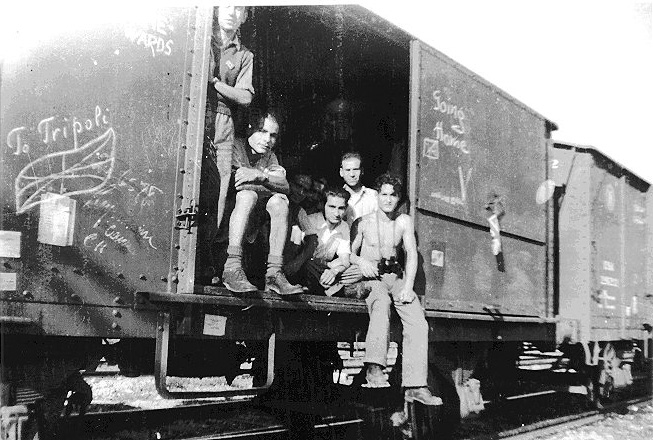
Libyan Jewish survivors of the Bergen-Belsen concentration camp return home, 1945.

The coastal parts of Italian Libya became an integral part of Italy under a law of 9 January 1939, and Libya came to be called "the Fourth Shore of Italy" (Quarta Sponda). Libyans were given "Special Italian Citizenship" that was only valid within Libya. Libyans were allowed join the Muslim Association of the Lictor, a branch of the National Fascist Party. This allowed the creation of Libyan military units within the Italian army: the 1st Sibille and 2nd Pescatori The units had Italian officers with Libyan NCOs and soldiers. The Libyan divisions were loyal to Italy and performed well in combat. Squadrons of Libyan Spahis served as light cavalry. These measures reduced the appeal of the Libyan resistance movement and kept it mostly limited to Fezzan, and even there it remained weak before the arrival of Free French troops in the area. Beginning in the late 1930s, Libyan Jews faced the persecution of the Holocaust in Libya.

Libya saw some of the fiercest fighting of the North African campaign. At the start of the war, Italy aimed to extend Libya's borders to the south and annex a land bridge connecting it to Italian East Africa. In September 1940, Italy launched the Western Desert campaign with its invasion of Egypt. That December, the British counterattacked with Operation Compass, which pushed Italian forces back over the border, occupied all of Cyrenaica, and captured most of the Tenth Army. With German support, this territory was regained during Operation Sonnenblume, though the Allies successfully lifted the Siege of Tobruk. The Battle of Gazala in 1942 finally drove the Allies from Tobruk and back into Egypt. The Second Battle of El Alamein in Egypt spelled doom for the Axis forces in Libya and the end of the Western Desert campaign.

In February 1943, retreating German and Italian forces abandoned Libya and withdrew to Tunisia, permanently ending Italian rule. The Free French occupied Fezzan in 1943. At the close of World War II, Britain and France collaborated with local resistance in the Allied administration of Libya. In 1951, the Allies ceded power to Idris, now king of an independent Libya.

== Liechtenstein ==
After the end of World War I, Liechtenstein concluded a customs and monetary agreement with Switzerland and entrusted its larger neighbor with its external relations. Following the Austrian Anschluss of March 1938, Prince Franz abdicated in favor of his third cousin, Franz Joseph II. Franz's wife Elisabeth von Gutmann was Jewish, and it was worried that her ancestry could provoke Nazi Germany. With the German occupation of Czechoslovakia, the vast lands that the House of Liechtenstein owned there were confiscated, forcing Prince Franz Joseph to move to Liechtenstein itself, the first prince to take up residence within the principality.

When war broke out, Franz Joseph kept the principality out of the war and relied upon its close ties to Switzerland for its protection. The neutrality of the country itself was never violated, but the House of Liechtenstein never recovered its landholdings outside the principality, including its former seat in Lednice–Valtice. The country took in some 400 Jewish refugees from occupied Europe and granted citizenship to some others, mostly people of means who were able to pay. Jewish laborers at a concentration camp in Strasshof were hired out to work on estates belonging to the princely family. In 1945 Liechtenstein gave asylum to nearly 500 Russians of the pro-Axis First Russian National Army. It refused Soviet demands to repatriate them, and most eventually resettled in Argentina.

The National Socialist "German National Movement in Liechtenstein" was active but small. It called for unification with Germany and the expulsion of Liechtenstein's Jews. In March 1939, the party attempted a coup that ended in total failure, its leaders having fled or been arrested. The organization was formed anew in 1940 but did not gain any power. Its publication Umbruch was banned in 1943 and its leader was convicted of high treason after the war.

== Lithuania ==
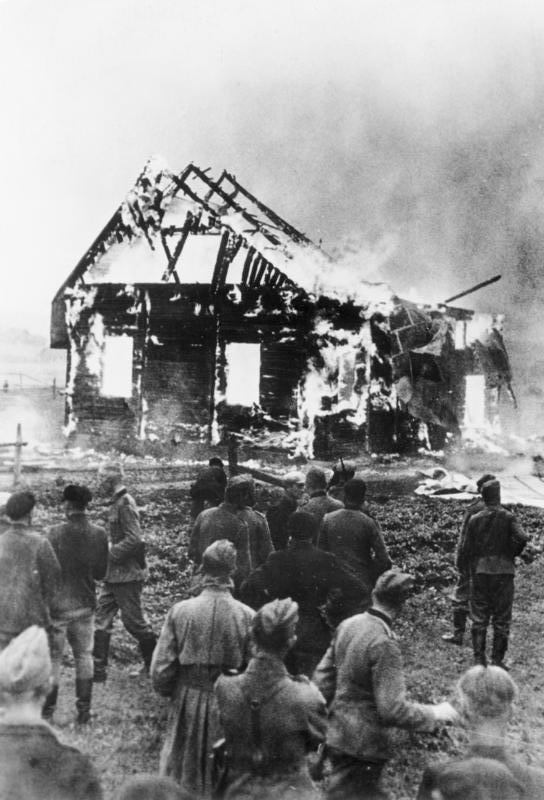
German soldiers and Lithuanians watch the burning of a synagogue, 9 July 1941.

As a result of Molotov–Ribbentrop Pact between Nazi Germany and the Soviet Union, Lithuania was occupied by the Red Army and forcibly annexed into the Soviet Union along with Latvia and Estonia, with no military resistance. The legality of the annexation was not recognised by most Western countries and the Baltic states continued to exist as formally independent nations until 1991.

Some Lithuanians sided with Germany after Hitler eventually invaded the Soviet Union in the hopes of restoring Lithuania's independence. Some collaborators were involved in the Holocaust and other crimes against humanity. A Lithuanian division (the 16th Rifle Division) and other units (29th Rifle Corps) were formed in the Red Army. Unlike in Latvia, an attempt by the German authorities to form a 'Lithuanian Legion' failed, with the most notable unit formed being the Lithuanian Territorial Defense Force.

At the end of the war, the subsequent Forest Brothers armed insurrection against the Soviet authorities started, which lasted in the Baltic states until the mid-1950s.

== Luxembourg ==
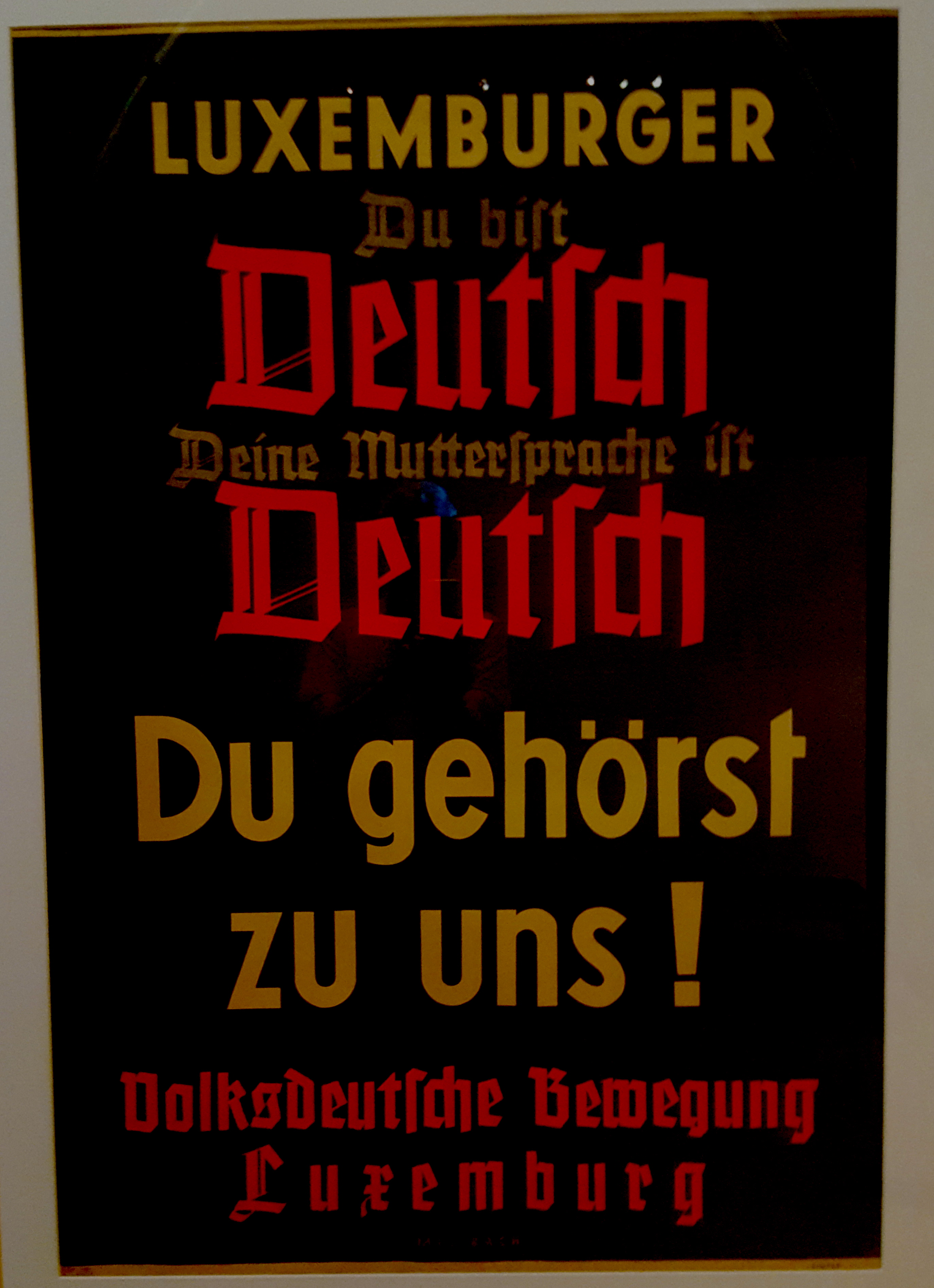
Propaganda poster during the occupation: "Luxembourger, you are German, your mother tongue is German!"

When Germany invaded France by way of the Low Countries in the spring of 1940, it also invaded Luxembourg, despite its neutrality. The country was occupied quickly: the government made an attempt to slow the advancing German forces, but local forces put up little resistance and surrendered before the end of the first day. During the German occupation, the administration was led by Gustav Simon, who pursued a policy of Germanisation and carried out the Holocaust in Luxembourg. In August 1942, Germany fully annexed Luxembourg and attached it to Gau Moselland.

The exiled Luxembourgish government meanwhile fled to France and then Portugal before establishing itself in London for the remainder of the war, while Grand Duchess Charlotte settled in Montreal. The exiled government committed its very limited resources to the Allied war effort, signing the Declaration of St James's Palace and Declaration by United Nations. It also formed the agreement that created the Benelux customs union with the exiled governments of Belgium and the Netherlands.

Some Luxembourgers collaborated with Nazi Germany or were drafted into the German armed forces. A total of 12,000 Luxembourgers served in the German military, of whom nearly 3,000 died during the war. Others joined the Luxembourg Resistance. The general strike of 1942 was an act of passive resistance that mobilized a large portion of the population and led to the execution of 21 leaders. American forces liberated the capital in September 1944, but the country continued to see combat. Luxembourg Resistance fought German forces in the Battle of Vianden in November, and the Battle of the Bulge was fought in the country between December and January.

== Madagascar ==
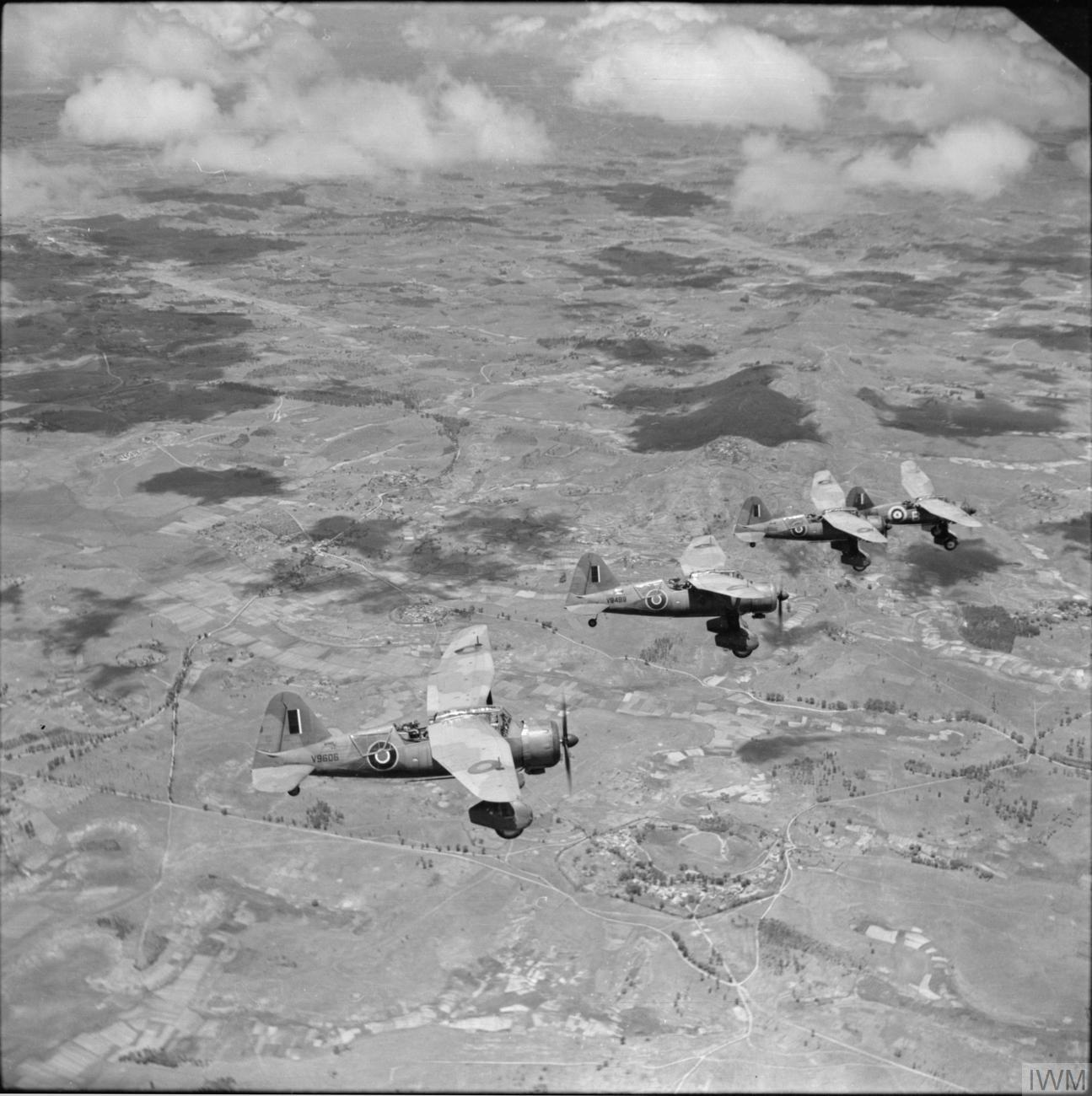
Royal Air Force Westland Lysander aircraft fly over Madagascar in 1942.

French Madagascar played an important role in the war due to the presence of critically important harbors and the contribution of Malagasy troops. After the fall of France in 1940, Madagascar became a crucial flashpoint in the conflict between the Free French movement and Vichy France. The island was consequential in the Pacific theater of the war as Imperial Japanese naval forces operated unopposed off the island for some time. Madagascar was also briefly considered as the solution to the Jewish Question by the government of Nazi Germany who floated the idea of deporting Europe's Jewish population to the island in 1940. This scheme, the Madagascar Plan, never came to fruition for a variety of reasons.

In May 1942, the British and several other Allied forces launched an invasion of Madagascar, seeking to protect its position as a link in Allied shipping and deny its use to the Axis. The northern naval base at Diego Suarez quickly surrendered. That September, newly arrived troops from East Africa, South Africa, and Northern Rhodesia launched an offensive to capture the rest of the island. British forces took the capital Tananarive in late September; on 8 November, the last Vichy forces surrendered. The British handed the island over to Free France in 1943, under whose control it remained for the rest of the war.

== Malaya ==
Malaya was under British rule before the war began. It was occupied by Japan from 1942 to 1945. The Malayan Communist Party became the backbone of the Malayan Peoples' Anti-Japanese Army. The British Forces in Malaya fled to Singapore, where they would eventually be defeated. After the war, the British Military Administration of Malaya took over the country.

The 4 Malay states of Kedah, Perlis, Kelantan and Terengganu were annexed by Thailand, which was under a Fascist Regime and aligned to the Axis Powers. These territories were gifted by Japan, as they had occupied Malaya almost 2 years prior. All 4 states were given back to Malaya after the Japanese Surrender.

== Maldives ==
During World War II, the Maldives were a British protected state ruled by a succession of sultans. The islands were only lightly affected by the war. Britain built RAF Gan on Addu Atoll at the southern end of the country, which was later redeveloped as Gan International Airport. The Action of 27 February 1941 occurred near the Maldives. The Italian auxiliary cruiser Ramb I had escaped the destruction of the Red Sea Flotilla and sailed for Japanese-controlled territory. HMNZS Leander engaged and sank Ramb I; most of the crew were rescued and taken to Gan. The RAF forces created "Port T". The Maldive Islands, the British Indian Ocean Territory, Ceylon and other naval bases and areas in the Indian Ocean were victims to the Easter Sunday Raids of 1941.

The Maldives were also a victim to massive resource shortages, notably economy and food-wise. Most food was imported into the country by boat during the war, and the nation relied on local fishing in the islands. This was commonly known as the great famine in the Maldives.

== Malta ==
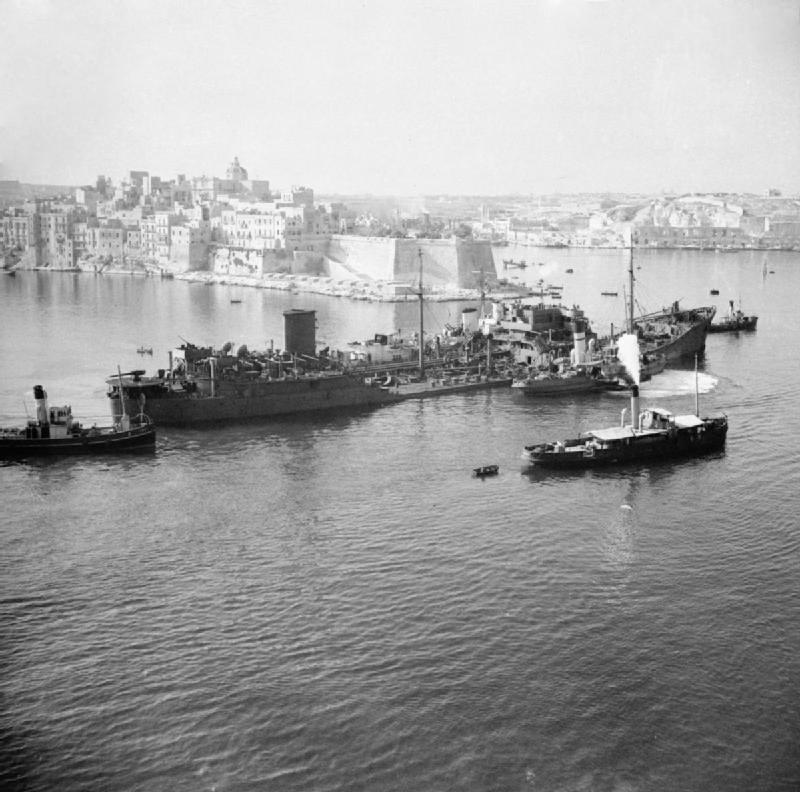
The tanker Ohio enters Grand Harbour after Operation Pedestal, 15 August 1942.

Malta was a British colony during World War II. The Legislative Council of Malta reaffirmed the people's loyalty to Britain on 6 September 1939. Between June 1940 and December 1942, Malta became the besieged and battered arena for one of the most decisive struggles of World War II. Malta was the most bombed place in the war and was crucial to Allied efforts to thwart Axis maneuvers in Africa. Britain awarded the George Cross to the island of Malta in a letter dated 15 April 1942, from King George VI to Governor William Dobbie: "To honour her brave people, I award the George Cross to the Island Fortress of Malta to bear witness to a heroism and devotion that will long be famous in history".

The fortitude of the population under sustained air raids and a naval blockade, which almost saw them starved into submission, won widespread admiration, with some historians dubbing it "the Mediterranean Stalingrad". The George Cross is woven into the modern Flag of Malta.

== Manchukuo ==
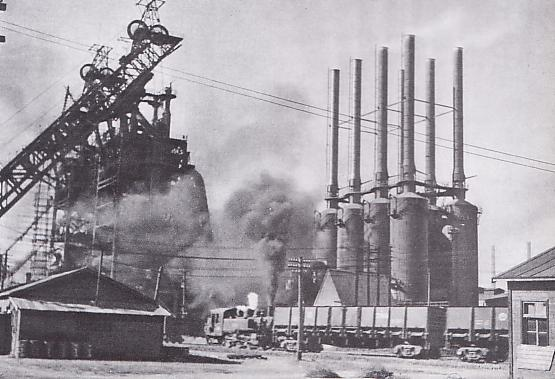
The Showa Steel Works produced millions of tonnes of steel for the Japanese war effort.

Established in 1931 as a puppet state of Japan, the Empire of Manchukuo was led by Pu Yi, the last Emperor of China, who reigned as Emperor Kang De. The state remained a loyal ally to Japan until 1945. In 1945, the Soviet Union declared war on Japan, and Manchukuo was subsequently invaded and abolished. The former puppet state was subsequently returned to China.

== Mauritius ==
During the Second World War, the Mauritius Territorial Force was expanded to two battalions and renamed the Mauritius Regiment. The 1st Battalion went to Diego Suarez, Madagascar, in December 1943 to relieve imperial forces who had captured the island in the Battle of Madagascar. Shortly after landing, the battalion mutinied due to poor conditions and because they had been told they would not leave Mauritius. Disarmed by the King's African Rifles, 300 soldiers were arrested, but only 6 remained imprisoned by 1946. Mauritius also had a home guard formation, the Mauritius Defence Force of 2,000 men, and a naval Coastal Defence Force.

== Mengjiang ==
Mengjiang was established in Inner Mongolia as a puppet state of Japan, and contributed troops which fought alongside the Japanese in China. It ceased to exist following the Soviet invasion in 1945.

== Mexico ==
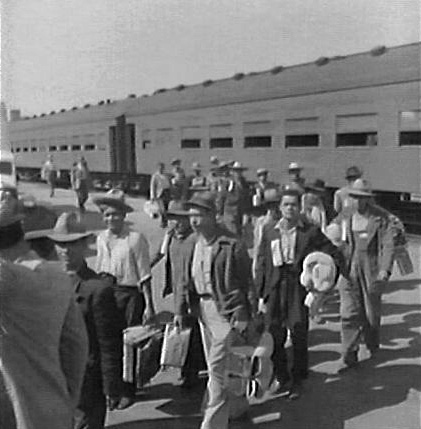
The first Braceros arrive in Los Angeles, 1942.

Mexico entered World War II in response to German attacks on Mexican ships. The Potrero del Llano, originally an Italian tanker, had been seized in port by the Mexican government in April 1941 and renamed in honor of a region in Veracruz. It was attacked and crippled by the German submarine U-564 on 13 May 1942. The attack killed 13 of 35 crewmen. On 20 May 1942, a second tanker, Faja de Oro, also a seized Italian ship, was attacked and sunk by the German submarine U-160, killing 10 of 37 crewmen. In response, President Manuel Ávila Camacho and the Mexican government declared war on the Axis powers on 22 May 1942.

A large part of Mexico's contribution to the war came through an agreement January 1942 that allowed Mexican nationals living in the United States to join the American armed forces. As many as 250,000 Mexicans served in this way. In the final year of the war, Mexico sent one air squadron to serve under the Mexican flag: the Mexican Air Force's Escuadrón Aéreo de Pelea 201 (201st Fighter Squadron), which saw combat in the Philippines in the war against Imperial Japan. In addition to those in the armed forces, tens of thousands of Mexican men were hired as farm workers in the United States during the war years through the Bracero program, which continued and expanded in the decades after the war.

World War II helped spark an era of rapid industrialization known as the Mexican Miracle. Mexico supplied the United States with more strategic raw materials than any other country, and American aid spurred the growth of industry. President Ávila was able to use the increased revenue to improve the country's credit, invest in infrastructure, subsidize food, and raise wages.

== Monaco ==
While Prince Louis II's sympathies were strongly pro-French, he tried to keep Monaco neutral during World War II, and he supported the Vichy France government of his old army colleague, Philippe Pétain. In 1943, the Italian army invaded and occupied Monaco, setting up a fascist government administration. Shortly thereafter, following Mussolini's collapse in Italy, the German army occupied Monaco and began the deportation of the Jewish population. Among them was René Blum, founder of the Ballet de l'Opera, who died in a Nazi extermination camp. In August 1944, the Germans executed three Resistance leaders. Under Prince Louis's secret orders, the Monaco police, often at great risk to themselves, warned in advance those people whom the Gestapo planned to arrest. The country was liberated, as German troops retreated, on 3 September 1944.

== Mongolia ==
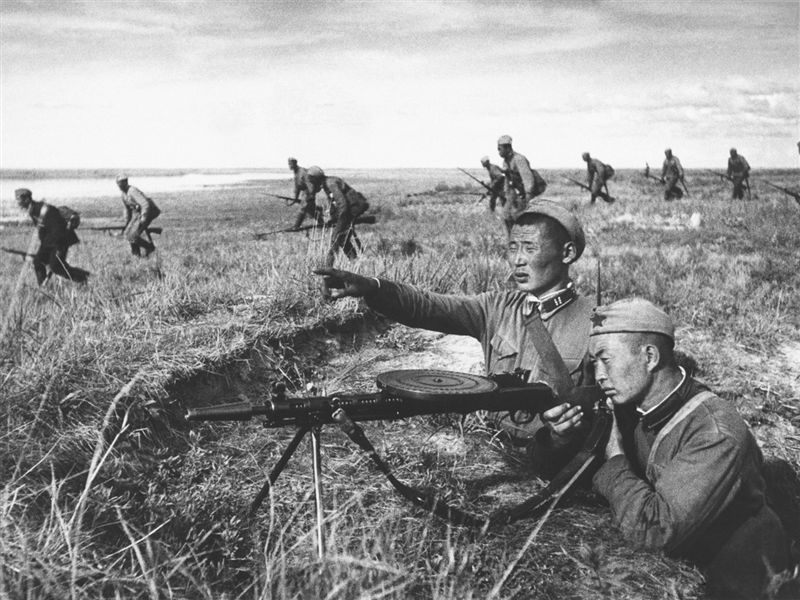
Mongolian People's Army soldiers at Khalkhin Gol, 1939

During the war, Mongolia—officially the Mongolian People's Republic—was ruled by the communist government of Khorloogiin Choibalsan and was closely linked to the Soviet Union. Mongolia was considered a breakaway province of the Republic of China by most nations. In August 1937, as part of their effort to support China, the Soviets decided to station troops along Mongolia's southern and southeastern frontiers. The arrival of the Soviet army coincided with a series of intensified terrors and purges (the "Great Terror").

The Soviet–Japanese Neutrality Pact of 13 April 1941 recognized the neutrality of Mongolia and its place with the Soviet sphere of influence. Its geographical situation made it a buffer state between Japanese forces and the Soviet Union. In addition to keeping around 10% of the population under arms, Mongolia provided supplies and raw materials to the Soviet military and financed several units, and half million military trained horses.

Mongolian troops took part in the Battle of Khalkhin Gol in the summer of 1939 and in the Soviet invasion of Manchuria in August 1945, both times as small part in Soviet-led operations. On 10 August 1945, the Little Khural, the Mongolian parliament, issued a formal declaration of war against Japan.

For Mongolia, the most important result of World War II was the recognition of its independence by China, American consent having been given with the Yalta agreement.

== Morocco ==
Most of Morocco was a protectorate of France during World War II, and entered on France's side at the beginning. When France was defeated, Morocco came under the control of the Vichy regime, and therefore was nominally on the side of the Axis powers, although an active resistance movement operated. In November 1942, it was invaded by the Allies as part of Operation Torch. From that point, Moroccan forces (especially the Goumier's) fought on the side of the Allies.

A small area in northern Morocco, Spanish Morocco, was a Spanish protectorate and remained neutral throughout the war, as did the international city of Tangier.

== Nauru ==
Nauru was administered by Australia under a League of Nations mandate. Nauru was shelled by a German surface raider in December 1940, aiming to incapacitate its phosphate mining operations (this action was probably the most distant military activity carried out by Germany during the entire war). Phosphates are important for making ammunition and fertilizers.

Nauru was occupied by Japan from 1942 to 1945, and was the target of shelling by American battleships and cruisers, and aerial bombing by the Allies. For example, Nauru was bombarded by the American battleships North Carolina, Washington, South Dakota, Indiana, Massachusetts, and the Alabama, on 8 December 1943, and also bombed by U.S. Navy carrier airplanes on the same day. See the article on the Washington.

== Nepal ==
The Kingdom of Nepal declared war on Germany on September 4, 1939. Once Japan entered the conflict, sixteen battalions of the Royal Nepalese Army fought in the Burma campaign. In addition to military support, Nepal contributed guns, equipment, and hundreds of thousands of pounds of tea, sugar and raw materials such as timber to the Allied war effort.

Besides RNA troops, Nepalese fought in the British Indian Gurkha units and were engaged in combat all over the world. A total of 250,280 Gurkhas served in 40 battalions during the war, in almost all theatres. In addition to keeping peace in India, Gurkhas fought in Syria, North Africa, Italy, Greece and against the Japanese in Burma, northeast India and Singapore. They did so with considerable distinction, earning 2,734 bravery awards and suffering around 32,000 casualties in all theatres. After the war, Gurkha troops formed part of the Allied occupation force in Japan.

== Netherlands ==
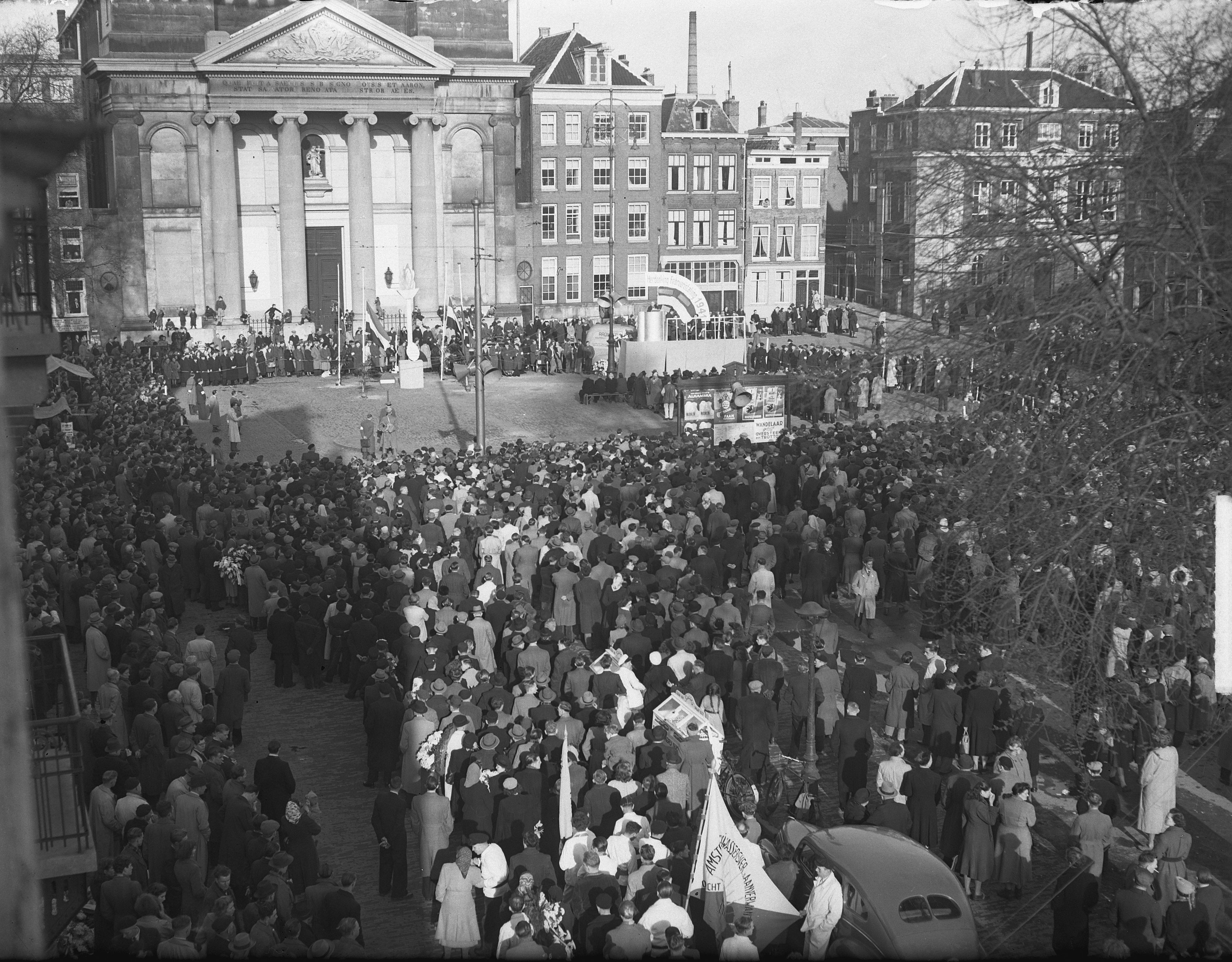
Dutch citizens gather in Amsterdam during the February Strike in protest of the deportation of Jews, 1941.

Like the Belgians, the Netherlands declared neutrality in 1939. In May 1940, the Netherlands was invaded after fierce resistance against the Nazis. Rotterdam and Middelburg were heavily bombed. The Dutch joined the Allies and contributed their surviving naval and armed forces to the defense of East Asia, in particular, the Netherlands East Indies. Until their liberation in 1945, the Dutch fought alongside the Allies around the globe, from the battles in the Pacific to the Battle of Britain. On the islands of Aruba and Curaçao (Netherlands West Indies) a large oil refinery was of major importance for the war effort in Europe, especially after D-day. As a protection, a considerable U.S. military force was stationed on the island.

== New Zealand ==
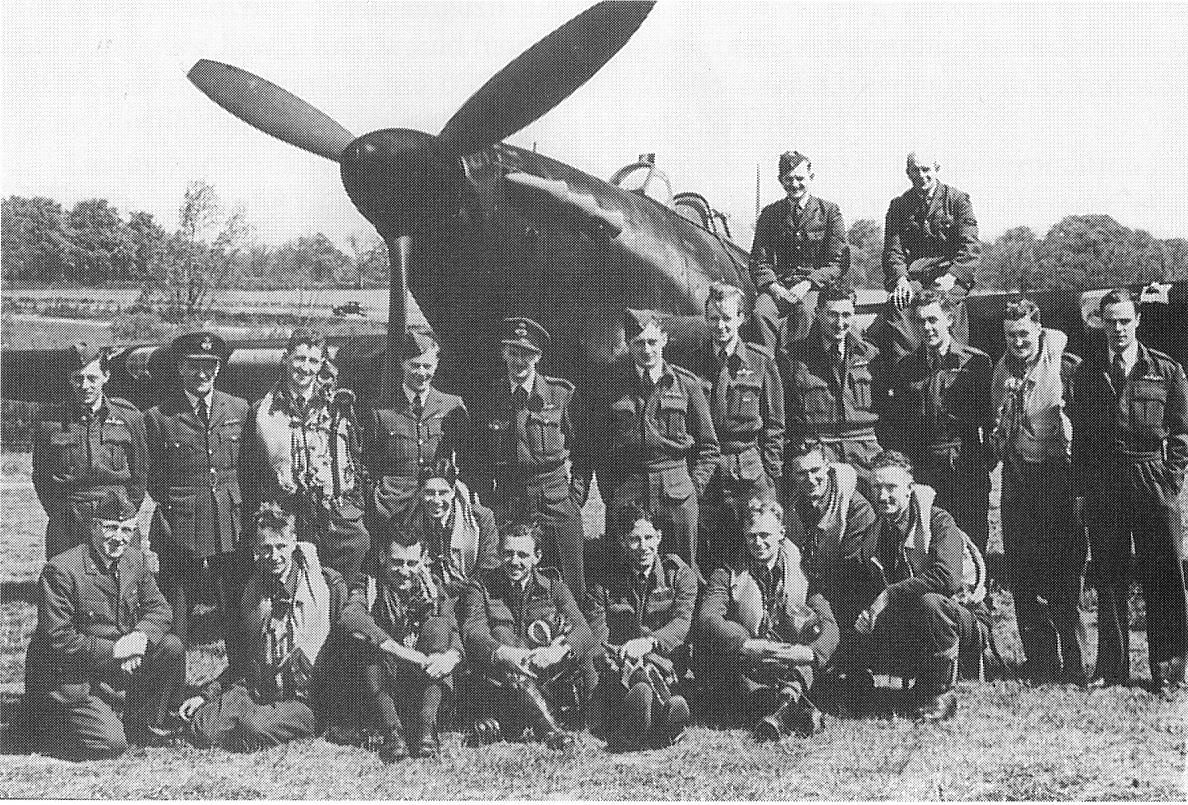
Night fighter pilots of No. 486 Squadron RNZAF, England, 1942

New Zealand declared war on 3 September 1939, backdating the date to the time of Britain's declaration.

With gratitude for the past and confidence in the future, we range ourselves without fear beside Britain. Where she goes, we go; where she stands, we stand. We are only a small and young nation, but we march with a union of hearts and souls to a common destiny.

New Zealand sent one Army division that served in Greece, North Africa, and Italy, and it offered a fair number of pilots and aircrew to the Royal Air Force in England. Royal New Zealand Navy (RNZN) warships fought in the South Atlantic, including in the Battle of Rio de la Plata in 1939, before being called back to defend the homeland.

New Zealand fought in the Pacific War through warships of the Royal New Zealand Navy, the Royal New Zealand Air Force (RNZAF), and independent army brigades, such as on Vella Lavella. While New Zealand's home islands were not attacked, the casualty rate suffered by the military was the worst per capita of all Commonwealth nations, except for Great Britain.

In the South West Pacific theater, the RNZAF participated in a unique force, AirSols, in the Solomon Islands, consisting of squadrons from the U.S. Marine Corps, U.S. Navy, USAAF, and RNZAF, with occasional help from the Royal Australian Air Force.

== Newfoundland ==
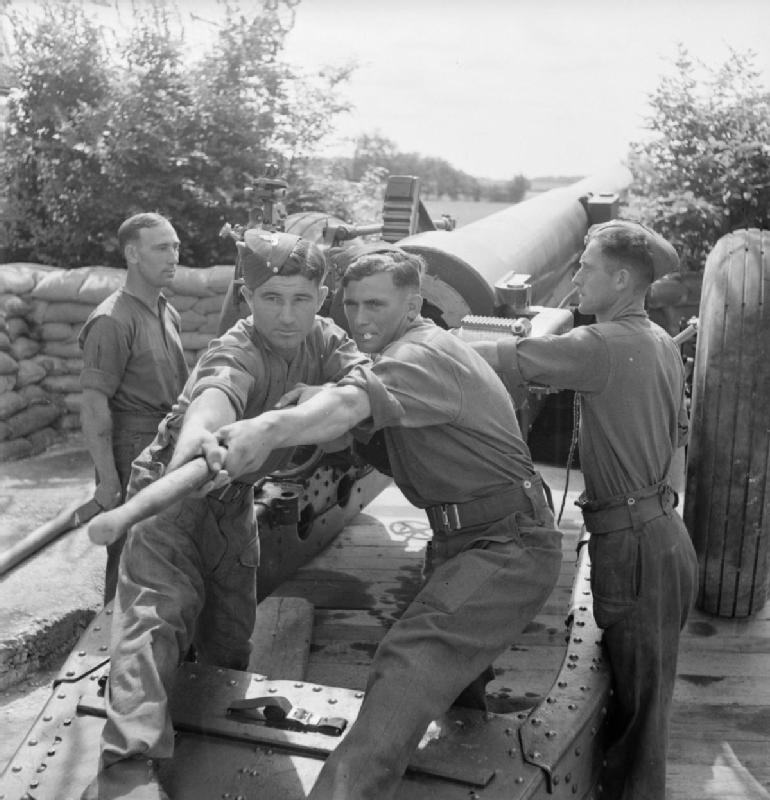
Newfoundlanders of the Royal Artillery load a gun while training in England, 1942.

During World War II the Dominion of Newfoundland was governed directly by the United Kingdom. It joined the war on 4 September 1939, declaring war on Germany. The defenses of Newfoundland, and the Newfoundland Home Guard forces were integrated with the Canadian military, and both governments agreed to form a joint coastal defense organization. As part of the Anglo-American Destroyers for Bases Agreement, the United States was granted Air Force and U.S. Navy bases on Newfoundland's territory. The influx of American money and personnel had significant social, economic, and political effects on the island.

Newfoundlanders were encouraged to enlist in the large armed forces of the United Kingdom and of Canada. Over 3,200 Newfoundlanders enlisted in the Royal Navy. On 14 September 1939, The Royal Navy requested 625 experienced fishermen or seamen for special service in the Northern Patrol, guarding the Atlantic shipping lanes. The Royal Artillery raised the 166th Newfoundland Field Artillery Regiment, which fought in North Africa and Italy, and the 59th Newfoundland Heavy Artillery, which fought in Normandy and northwestern Europe. Another 700 Newfoundlanders served in the Royal Air Force, most notably with the 125th Newfoundland Squadron. In all, some 15,000 Newfoundlanders saw active service, and thousands more were engaged in the hazardous duty of the Merchant Navy. Some 900 Newfoundlanders (including at least 257 Merchant Mariners) lost their lives in the conflict.

Newfoundland was directly attacked by German forces when U-boats attacked four Allied ore carriers and the loading pier at Bell Island. The cargo ships S.S. Saganaga and S.S. Lord Strathcona were sunk by the German submarine U-513 on 5 September 1942, and the S.S. Rosecastle and P.L.M. 27 were sunk by the German submarine U-518 on 2 November 1942. German troops were landed in Labrador to establish weather stations.

== Nicaragua ==
During the war, Nicaragua was ruled by Anastasio Somoza García, who had assumed the presidency after a military coup in 1937. Somoza was an ally of the United States, and Nicaragua declared war on Japan immediately after the attack on Pearl Harbor. Three days later, on 11 December, Nicaragua declared war on Germany and Italy, and, on 19 December, on Bulgaria, Romania, and Hungary. Out of these six Axis countries, only Romania reciprocated, declaring war on Nicaragua on the same day (19 December 1941).

== Nigeria ==
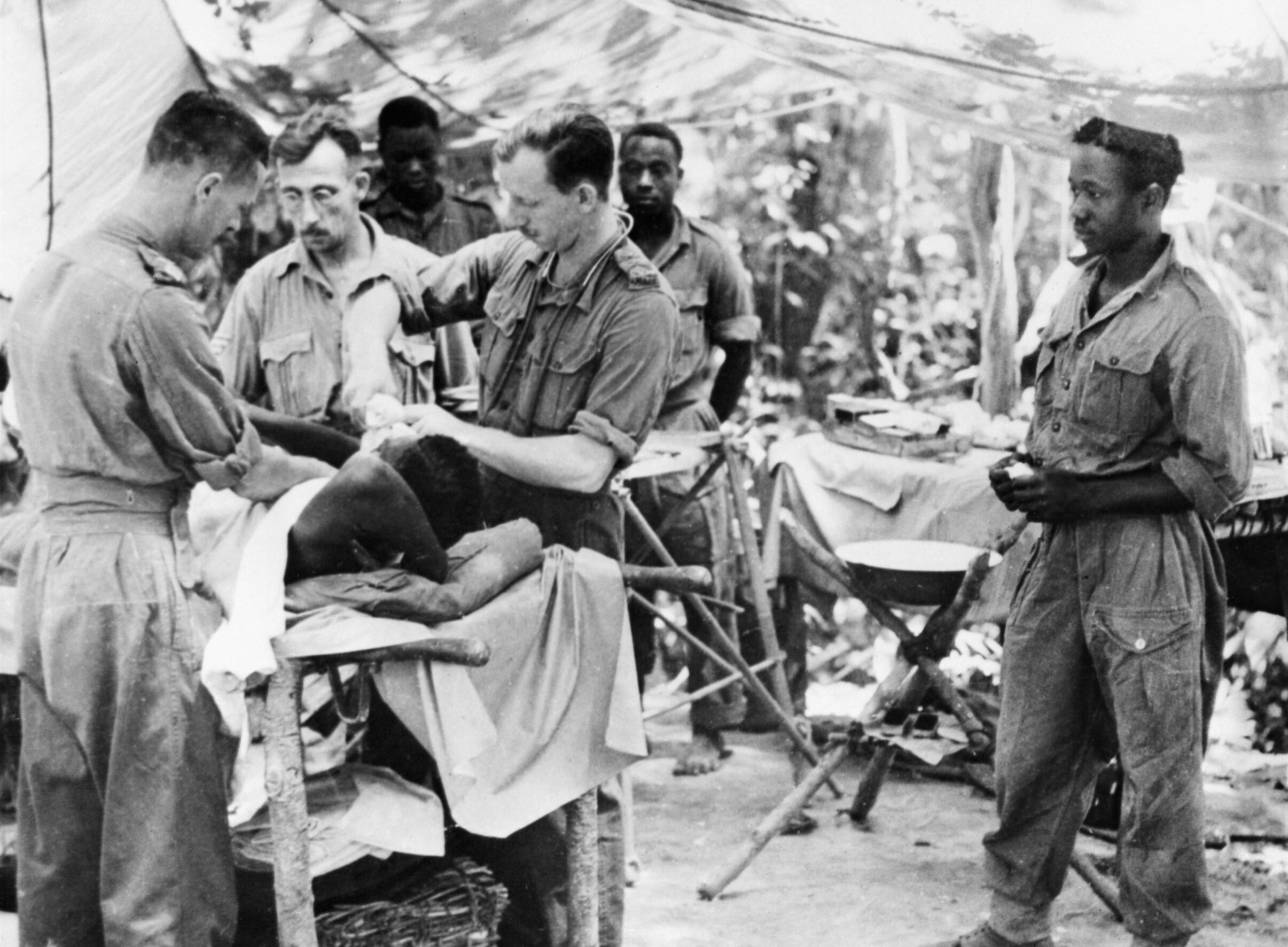
Doctors tend to a wounded soldier of the 81st West Africa Division in the Kaladan Valley, Burma, 1944.

During World War II, three battalions of the Nigeria Regiment fought in the East Africa campaign. Nigerian units also contributed to two divisions serving with British forces in Palestine, Morocco, Sicily and Burma. Wartime experiences provided a new frame of reference for many soldiers, who interacted across ethnic boundaries in ways that were unusual in Nigeria. Inside Nigeria, union membership increased sixfold during the war to 30,000. This rapid growth of organised labour brought new political forces into play. The war also made the British reappraise Nigeria's political future. In 1944, Herbert Macaulay and Nnamdi Azikiwe founded the National Council of Nigeria and the Cameroons, a nationalist and pro-labour political party advocating Nigerian independence.

== Northern Rhodesia (Zambia) ==
Northern Rhodesia (now Zambia) was a British colony. As such, it was covered by the British declaration of war. Northern Rhodesian units served in East Africa, Madagascar and Burma.

== Norway ==
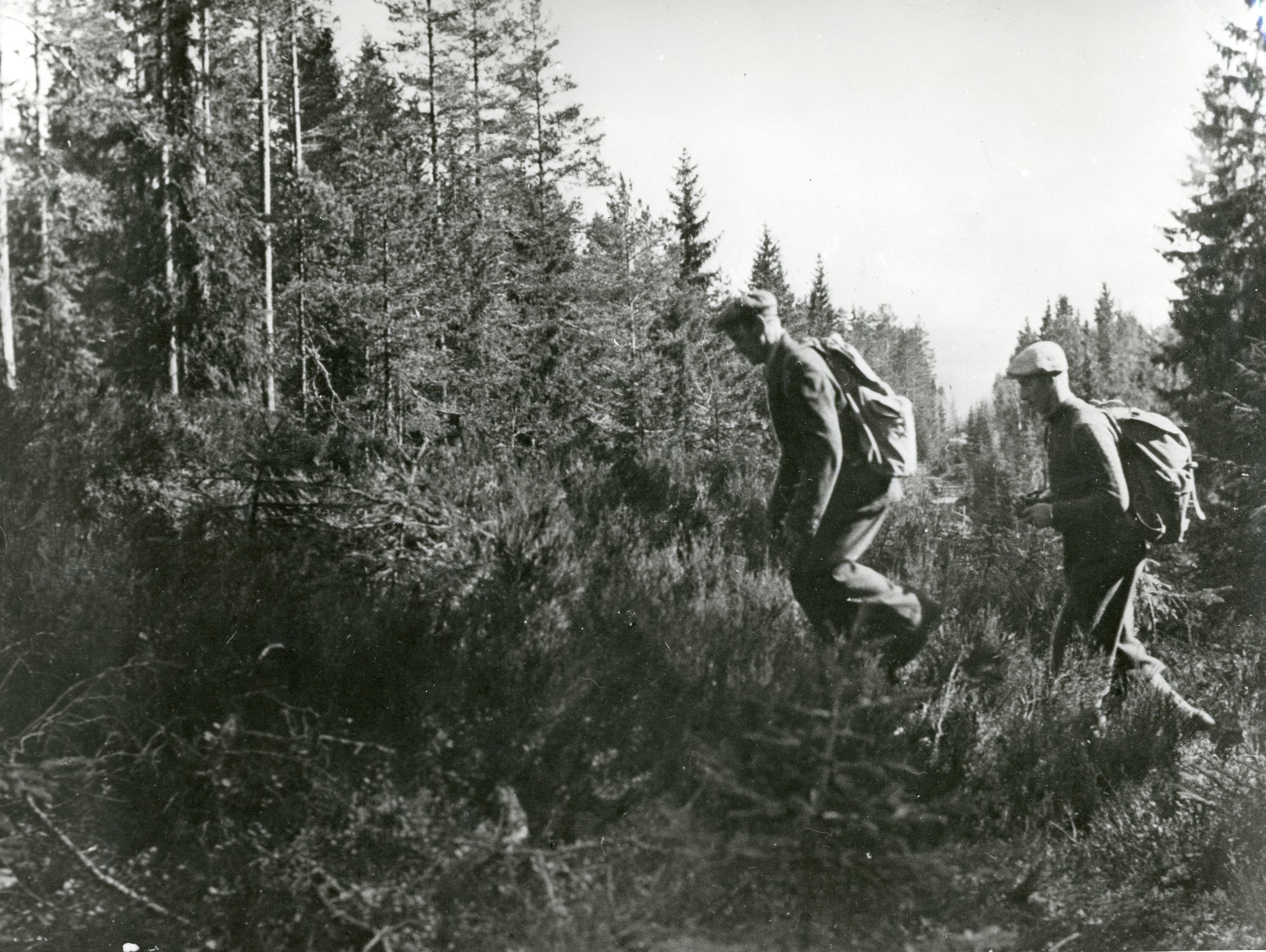
Norwegian refugees cross the border into Sweden.

Norway was strategically important as a route for the transport of iron ore from Sweden to Germany, via Narvik. Both sides had designs on Scandinavia. Norwegian neutrality was compromised in the Altmark incident.

Norway remained neutral until it was invaded by Germany on 9 April 1940, as part of Operation Weserübung. The Norwegian government fled the capital and after two months of fighting went to Britain and continued the fight in exile.

The Norwegian Shipping and Trade Mission (Nortraship) was established in London in April 1940 to administer the merchant fleet outside German-controlled areas. Nortraship operated some 1,000 vessels and was the largest shipping company in the world. British politician, Philip Noel-Baker, Baron Noel-Baker commented after the war that "Without the Norwegian merchant fleet, Britain and the allies would have lost the war."

After the occupation, the Germans began producing heavy water in Norway. After commando raids and bomber attacks, the Germans decided to move heavy water supplies to Germany. The Allies maintained a deception of a planned invasion of Norway. As a result, additional German forces were held there to repel any attempts. In 1944, Finnmark was liberated by the Soviet Union, and (together with the northern parts of Troms) totally destroyed by the retreating Nazis. German forces surrendered on 8 May 1945.

Norway declared war on Japan on 6 July 1945, with reciprocal effect dating back to 7 December 1941. The delay was because it had been impossible for the parliament to convene during the German occupation. Several hundred Norwegian sailors died when their ships were sunk by Japanese forces or during subsequent captivity. After the war, Norway became one of the founding members of NATO.

== Nyasaland (Malawi) ==
Throughout the war, the Nyasaland Protectorate was an economic asset for the Allies and contributed a significant number of soldiers to fight in the British Army. At the outbreak of war, the Acting Governor requested aid, fearful that the German settlers might organize a pro-Nazi uprising. In response, 50 soldiers from Southern Rhodesia arrived in Nyasaland by air. They returned to Salisbury after only a month, having found no risk of a possible rebellion. A number of camps were constructed in Nyasaland intended to house Polish war refugees. Additionally, perceived "enemy aliens" – primarily members of the German community, but also Italian settlers – were brought to Southern Rhodesia for internment during the war.

Many Nyasas fought for the British, primarily as askaris of the King's African Rifles (KAR). Others were recruited into the Artillery, Engineers, Service Corps and Medical Corps, placing the total number of enlisted Nyasas at around 27,000. Nyasas fought in a number of theatres, including the East African campaign, the Italian invasion of British Somaliland, the Battle of Madagascar, and the Burma campaign. Nyasaland's economy benefited from the end of the war as returning soldiers came home with useful skills, such as the 3,000 who had been trained as lorry drivers.

== Oman ==
The Sultan of Oman declared war on Germany on September 10, 1939, as it was then part of the British Empire as a protectorate. During the Second World War, Great Britain recognized the strategic importance of Oman's geographical location by expanding facilities throughout the country. A new airfield was built on Masirah Island, which, from 1943 onwards, housed No. 33 Staging Post. In 1943, both Masirah and Ras Al-Hadd became Royal Air Force stations in their own right. Units of No. 2925 Squadron of the RAF Regiment guarded these bases while the marine craft was based in Oman to perform air-sea rescue duties.

== Ostland ==
The Reichskommissariat Ostland (RKO; lit. 'Reich Commissariat of Eastland')[a] was an administrative entity of the Reich Ministry for the Occupied Eastern Territories of Nazi Germany from 1941 to 1945. It served as the German civilian occupation regime in Lithuania, Latvia, Estonia, and the western part of the Byelorussian SSR during the Eastern Front of World War II.

Ostland was established after the success of the Wehrmacht's Baltic operation and an initial period of military administration by Army Group North Rear Area based on the equivalent Reichskommissariat Baltenland in German planning documents.[1] It was divided into Generalbezirk Estland (Estonia), Generalbezirk Lettland (Latvia), Generalbezirk Litauen (Lithuania), and Generalbezirk Weißruthenien (Belarus) each with its own Nazi collaborationist government and Auxiliary Police under the control of a German Generalkommissar. Hinrich Lohse served as the Reichskommissar from 1941 to 1944 and Erich Koch from 1944 to 1945.

== Pacific Islands ==
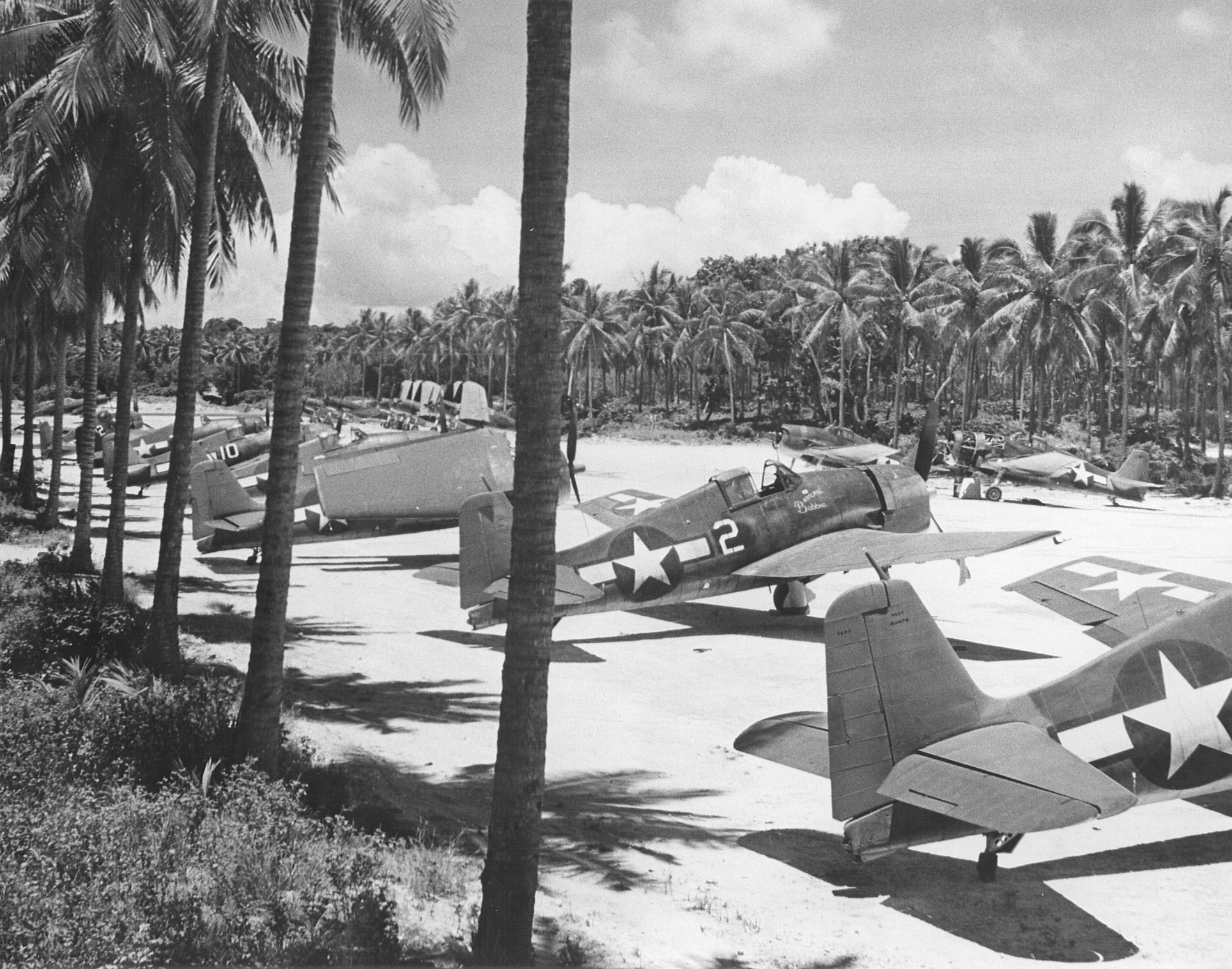
American Hellcats on Espiritu Santo island in February 1944

The population, culture and infrastructure of Melanesia, Micronesia and Polynesia (the Pacific Islands) were completely changed between 1941 and 1945 due to the logistical requirements of the Allies in their war against Japan. At the start of the war the islands had experienced 200 years of colonialism from Europe and its colonies; some islands were on the verge of being fully annexed while others were close to independence. The early Japanese expansion through the western Pacific then introduced a new colonial system to many islands. The Japanese occupation subjected the indigenous people of Guam and other Islands to forced labor, family separation, incarceration, execution, concentration camps, and forced prostitution, but also created opportunities for advanced education.

The Pacific Islands then experienced military action, massive troop movements, and resource extraction and building projects as the Allies pushed the Japanese back to their home islands. The juxtaposition of all these cultures led to a new understanding among the indigenous Pacific Islanders of their relationship with the colonial powers. In communities that had very little contact with Europeans before the war, the sudden arrival and rapid departure of men and machines spurred the growth of so-called "cargo cults" in parts of Melanesia, such as the cult of John Frum that emerged in the New Hebrides (modern Vanuatu).

== Palestine ==
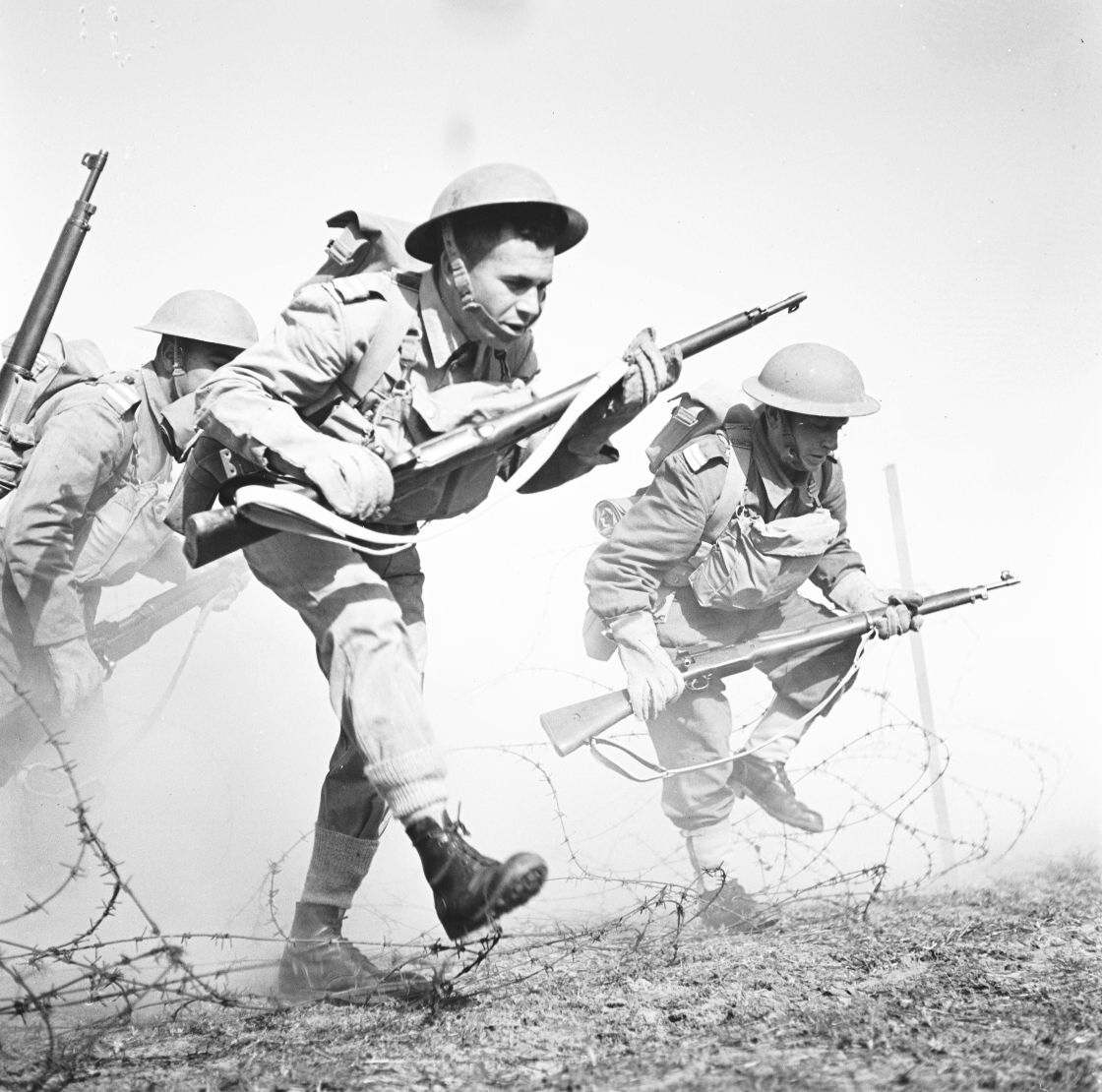
Soldiers of the Palestine Regiment train at Sarafand base, 1942.

Mandatory Palestine remained under British rule via the League of Nations mandate system. During the war, Palestine was a location of hostilities, a staging area for the British and a source of troops. In July 1940, Italy began a bombing campaign against Palestine. German and Vichy French aircraft also attacked Palestine. The attacks mainly targeted the city of Haifa with its strategic port and oil refineries, although Tel Aviv was also hit, with the deadliest raid of the war taking place there, along with some other locations.

The Yishuv, or Jewish community of Palestine, rallied to the British war effort in spite of its grievances against the British due to the White Paper of 1939, which greatly restricted Jewish immigration, as Nazi Germany was seen as a greater threat. The Yishuv's primary leader and future Prime Minister of Israel David Ben-Gurion declared that the Jews of Palestine would "support the British as if there is no White Paper and oppose the White Paper as if there is no war". The right-wing Irgun underground movement also felt this way and many of its leaders were released from prison. The more radical branch of the Irgun disagreed and, on 17 July 1940, it split under the leadership of Avraham Stern and became known as "The National Military Organization in Israel" as opposed to Irgun's official name, "The National Military Organization in the Land of Israel". It would later change its name to Lehi, referred to by the British as the "Stern Gang", as a completely separated militia.

In 1941, the main Jewish underground paramilitary group in Palestine, the Haganah, established the Palmach as an elite strike force. It initially received British training and support, although the British later attempted to disarm it. During the Syria–Lebanon campaign, Palmach fighters participated in combat alongside Allied troops. It was during this campaign that Moshe Dayan, attached to the Australian 7th Division, lost an eye, requiring him to wear what would become his trademark eye-patch.

In 1942, after the Germans advanced into Egypt and until they were stopped at the Second Battle of El Alamein, there was widespread fear in the Yishuv that the Germans would reach Palestine, a period that became known as the 200 days of dread. According to historical research, an Einsatzgruppen unit, Einsatzkommando Egypt, was prepared to carry out the mass murder of the Jews of Palestine after German occupation. The British prepared a defensive plan called Palestine Final Fortress. The Yishuv's leaders also prepared for a potential last stand by the Haganah.

About 30,000 Jews from Palestine served in the British Armed Forces during the war. Most served in logistical, engineering, guard, and other support roles, although some did see combat. According to research by historian Mustafa Abbasi, about 12,000 Palestinian Arabs also served in the British military during the war. This figure is also cited by Rashid Khalidi. According to Benny Morris, this estimate was probably double the true figure, with most serving as service personnel on bases inside Palestine.

Of the Jewish soldiers from Palestine, large numbers served in the Royal Pioneer Corps and were deployed in the North African campaign, Battle of France, and German invasion of Greece. While engaged mainly in logistical tasks, they were also armed and participated in combat when the situation demanded. The British Army also recruited local volunteers into commando units, forming the Special Interrogation Group, which was composed mainly of German-speaking Jews from Palestine, and No. 51 Commando, composed of 240 and 120 Arab volunteers from Palestine.

A total of 2,031 Palestinian Jews served in the Royal Air Force during World War II. Most served in support roles, including hundreds who served as aircraft mechanics. In addition, 37 became accomplished aircrews, including 20 pilots. Some Palestinian Jews also served in the Royal Navy and British Merchany Navy.

Following a particularly deadly Italian air raid in Tel Aviv in September 1940, the British recruited Haganah men to serve as anti-aircraft gunners defending Palestine. The 1st Palestine Light Anti-Aircraft Battery was formally established in October 1940 and became operational in early 1941. Its gunners defended Palestine from Axis air raids and also served elsewhere throughout the Mediterranean theater with British forces.

In 1942, the British Army formed the Palestine Regiment for volunteers from Palestine. In order to maintain the status quo ante bellum between the Jews and the Arabs, the British instated a policy of equal recruitment from both groups to the Palestine Regiment. However, due to the events of the 1936–1939 Arab revolt in Palestine and the alliance of exiled former Grand Mufti of Jerusalem Hajj Mohammad Amin al-Husayni with Adolf Hitler, only one Arab volunteered for every three Jewish volunteers. On August 6, 1942, the policy was relinquished and the regiment was formed, containing three Jewish battalions and one Arab. The regiment was assigned mostly to guard duty in Egypt and North Africa.

On 3 July 1944, Britain agreed to form a special Jewish combat unit. Thus the three Jewish battalions of the Palestine Regiment together with the 200th Field Regiment were reorganized under the aegis of the Jewish Brigade, which would see action in Italy. The Jewish Brigade participated in the Spring 1945 offensive in Italy.

At the start of the war, approximately a thousand German nationals residing in Palestine known as Templers were deported by Britain to Australia, where they were held in internment camps until 1946–47. Although some had been registered members of the Nazi party and Nazi marches had taken place in their settlements, no evidence had been presented until 2007 that the majority supported Hitler. Although their property had been confiscated by the British authorities, the State of Israel chose to compensate them in 1962.

== Panama ==
The small Panama Canal Zone was United States territory, and American forces from the U.S. Navy, U.S. Army, the USAAF (at Howard Air Force Base), and Colombian forces helped inside the Canal Zone, guarded the Panama Canal from both ends. This Canal provided the United States and its Allies with the ability to move warships and troops rapidly between the Atlantic Ocean and the Pacific Ocean. Since most of the American shipbuilding capability was on the East Coast and the Gulf of Mexico, the Canal was vital for moving new warships to the Pacific to fight the Imperial Japanese Navy.

== Paraguay ==
Paraguay's authoritarian government under Higinio Morínigo was sympathetic to the Axis powers early in the war; the country's large German community, in particular, were supporters of Nazism, as well as most of the Paraguayan population. Serious thought was given to joining the war on Germany's side, but United States President Franklin D. Roosevelt avoided this by providing aid and military hardware in 1942. Paraguay declared war on Germany on February 2, 1945, by which time the war was almost over and many Paraguayans joined the Brazilian air force for fighting the Axis Powers.

== Peru ==
Peru broke off relations with the Axis on 24 January 1942. Because of its ability to produce aviation fuel and its proximity to the Panama Canal, the oil refinery and port city of Talara, in northwest Peru, became an American air base. Although Peru did not declare war on Germany and Japan until February 1945 (Peru declared a "state of belligerency"), the Peruvian Navy patrolled the Panama Canal area. As many as 2,000 Peruvian citizens of Japanese descent were detained and sent to the United States under American orders as part of the Japanese American internment policy.

== Philippines ==
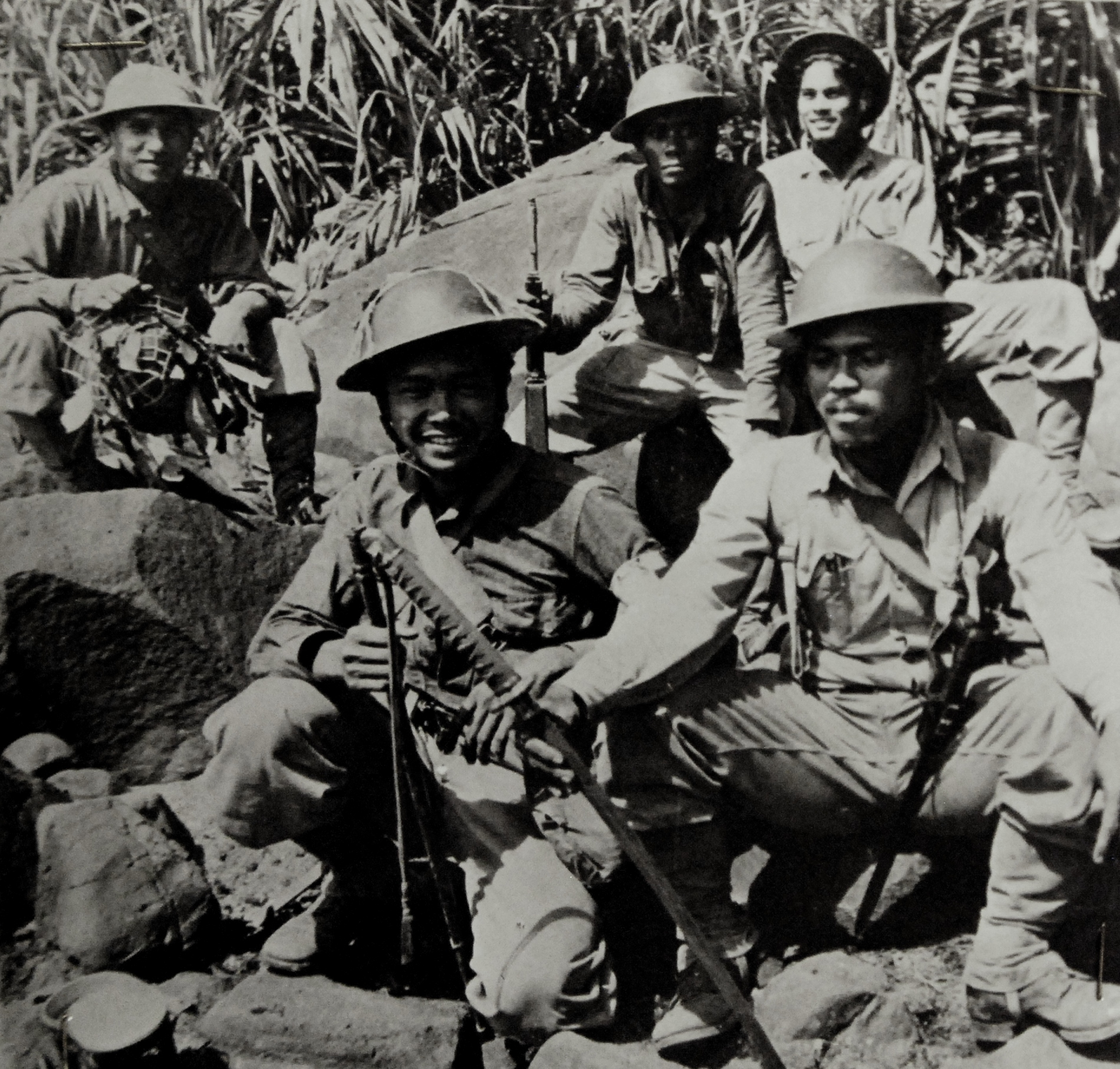
Philippine Scouts display a sword taken from the body of a Japanese officer during the Battle of Bataan, April 1942.

In 1941, the Philippine Commonwealth was a semi-independent commonwealth of the United States, with full Independence scheduled for 4 July 1946. The Philippine Commonwealth Army was commanded by American General Douglas MacArthur, and the Philippines was one of the first countries invaded by the Empire of Japan; combined Filipino and American forces maintained a stubborn resistance against the invasion. General MacArthur was ordered by the President to withdraw his headquarters to Australia, where he made his famous statement "I came out of Bataan, and I shall return". The Americans in the Philippines surrendered at Corregidor, on 6 May 1942.

Despite the official surrender, there was a significant local resistance movement to the Japanese Occupation. Elements of the Philippine Army continued their activity and were able to free all but twelve of the then-fifty Provinces of the Philippines, whilst other groups such as the Hukbalahap were also involved. While in exile, President Manuel L. Quezon continued to represent the Philippines until his death from tuberculosis in 1944. American forces under General MacArthur made their return in October 1944, beginning with amphibious landing on Leyte.

== Poland ==
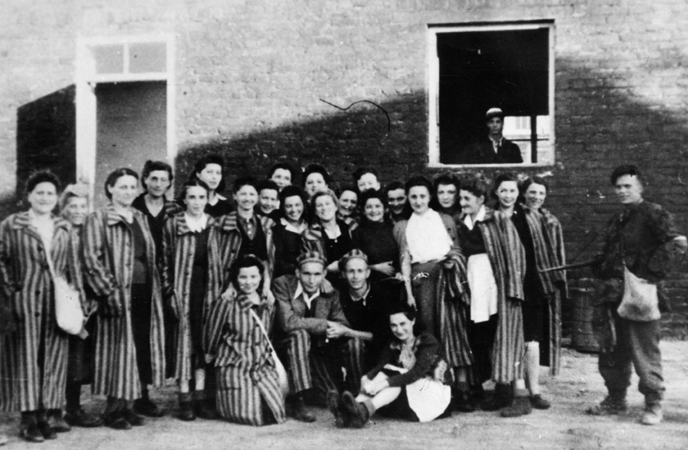
Jewish prisoners liberated by the Home Army during the 1944 Warsaw Uprising

The Second World War started in September 1939, as Poland suffered an attack by Nazi Germany and later by the USSR. Many Polish troops and other servicemen escaped the occupied country. They reorganized in France and took part in the Battle of France. Later Poles organized troops in the United Kingdom and were integrated into the forces of Britain with Polish pilots serving with distinction in the Battle of Britain. Polish soldiers also played an important role in the Battle of Monte Cassino in 1944. Poland was the only German-occupied country that never had any official collaboration with the Nazis. The Polish Resistance Movement was the largest anti-Nazi resistance in the whole Nazi-occupied Europe and the only non-Communist resistance among the Slavic countries. It is remembered for its daring and brave methods of resisting occupation, often facing German forces in a pitched battle. Polish armies also reformed in Soviet territory. The Polish-Jewish community was mostly exterminated in the Holocaust in Nazi-occupied Poland, while Poles themselves were considered to be a threat to the "German race", and were classified as "subhumans". Millions of Poles were sent to concentration camps or were killed in other fashions in occupied Poland. German-occupied Poland was the only territory where any kind of help for Jews was punishable by death for the helper and his whole family. However, many Polish civilians risked their lives, and the lives of their families, to save the Jews from the Nazis. Moreover, Poles created "Żegota" – the only organization in occupied Europe, entirely focused on helping the Jews.

== Portugal ==
For the duration of World War II, Portugal was under the control of the dictator António de Oliveira Salazar. Early in September 1939, Portugal proclaimed neutrality to avoid a military operation in Portuguese territory. This action was welcomed by Great Britain. Germany's invasion of France brought the Nazis to the Pyrenees, which increased the ability of Hitler to bring pressures on Portugal and Spain.

Following the Nazi invasion of the Soviet Union, which cut off their supply of tungsten metal, Germany sought tungsten from Portugal. Salazar attempted to limit their purchases, and in late 1941, German U-boats attacked Portuguese ships. In January 1942 Salazar signed an agreement to sell tungsten to Germany. In June 1943, Britain invoked the long-standing Anglo-Portuguese Alliance requesting the use of the Azores, to establish an air force and naval air base. Salazar complied at once. The Allies promised all possible aid in the event of a German attack and guaranteed the integrity of Portugal's territorial possessions. In 1944, Portugal declared a total embargo of tungsten shipments to Germany. Germany protested but did not retaliate.

Lisbon became a safe-haven to a scattering of Jews from all over Europe. Jewish refugees from Central Europe were granted resident status. After the German invasion of France, Portugal allowed thousands of Jewish refugees to enter the country. As the war progressed, Portugal gave entry visas to people coming via rescue operations, on the condition that Portugal would only be used as a transit point. More than 100,000 Jews and other refugees were able to flee Nazi Germany into freedom via Lisbon. By the early 1940s, there were thousands of Jews arriving in Lisbon and leaving weeks later to other countries.

=== Macau ===
Although the Japanese military invaded and occupied the neighboring British colony of Hong Kong in 1941, they initially avoided direct interference in the affairs of Macau. It remained a neutral territory, belonging to Portugal, but Portuguese authorities lacked the ability to prevent Japanese activities in and around Macau. In 1943, Japan ordered the government of Macau to accept Japanese advisors. The limited Portuguese military forces at Macau were disarmed, although Macau was never occupied.

=== Portuguese Timor (East Timor) ===
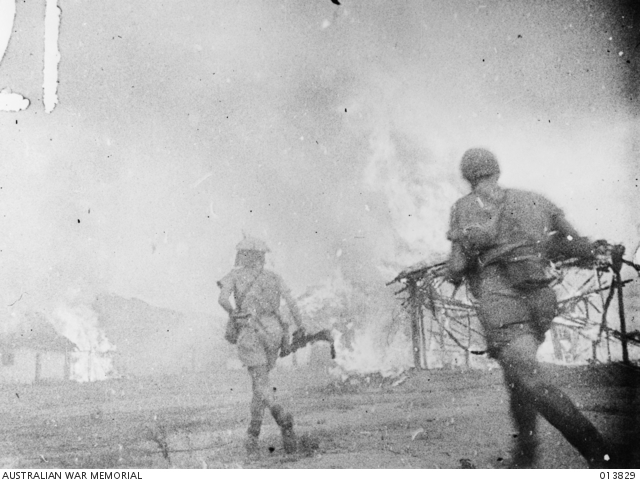
The village of Mindelo is burnt to the ground by Australian guerrillas to prevent its use as a Japanese base, December 1942.

In early 1942, Portuguese authorities maintained their neutrality, in spite of warnings from the Australian and Dutch East Indies governments that Japan would invade. To protect their own positions in neighboring Dutch Timor, Australian and Dutch forces landed in Portuguese Timor and occupied the territory. There was no armed opposition from Portuguese forces or the civilian population. However, within a matter of weeks, Japanese forces landed but were unable to subdue substantial resistance, in the form of a guerrilla campaign launched by Allied commandos and continued by the local population. It is estimated that 40,000–70,000 Timorese civilians were killed by Japanese forces during 1942–1945.

== Qatar ==
Qatar was a British protected state under the Persian Gulf Residency of the British Indian Empire. The country's first oil strike occurred at Dukhan in 1939, but the outbreak of war halted production. The petroleum industry that was to transform the country did not resume until after the war. The war also disrupted food supplies, prolonging a period of economic hardship going back to the 1920s with the collapse of the pearl trade, continuing through the Great Depression and a Bahraini embargo in 1937. Entire families and tribes moved to other parts of the Persian Gulf, leaving many Qatari villages deserted. Emir Abdullah bin Jassim Al Thani abdicated in 1940 in favor of his second son, Hamad bin Abdullah Al Thani.

== Romania ==
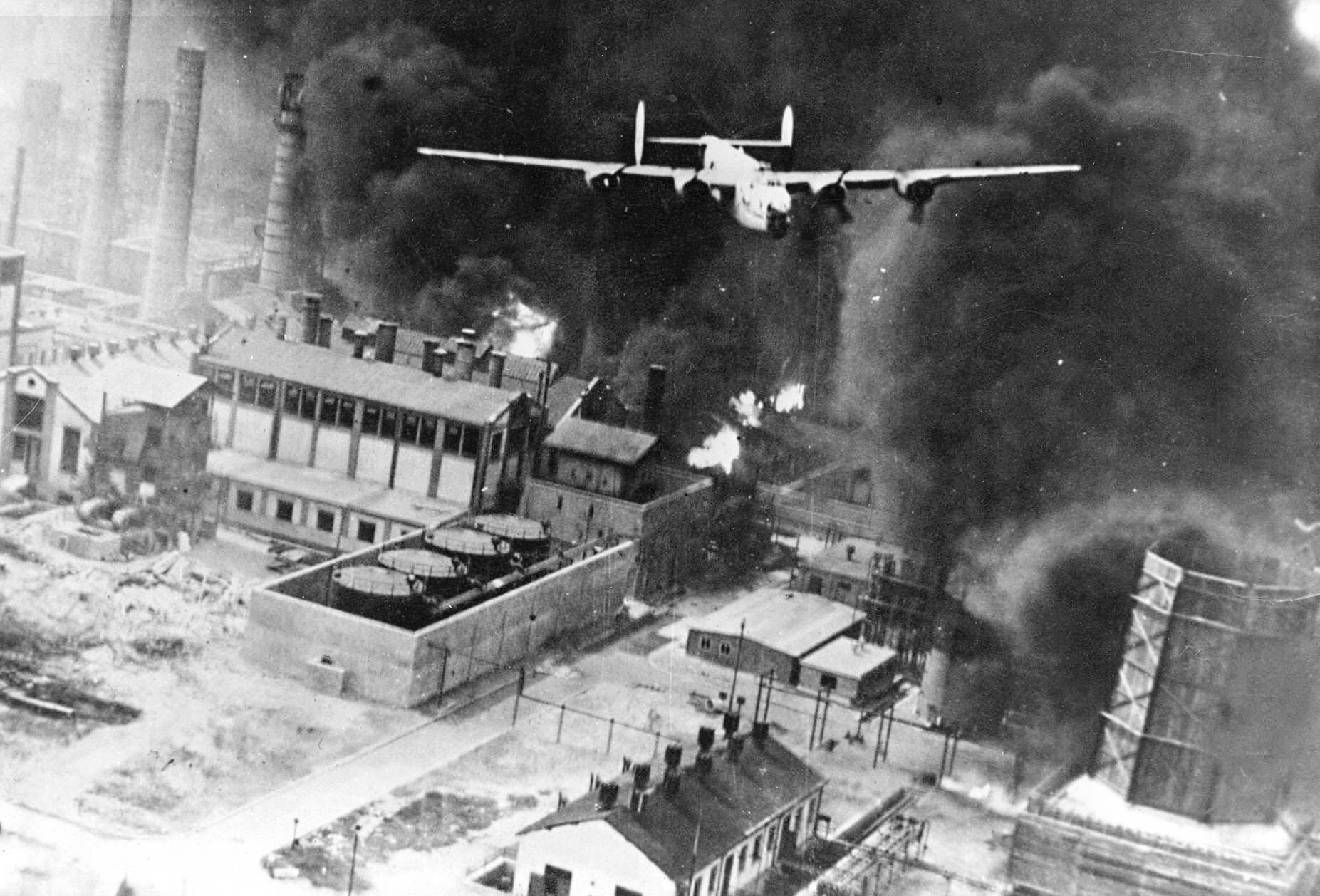
American bomber over a burning oil refinery at Ploiești in Operation Tidal Wave, August 1943

Romania had its first involvement in the war in providing transit rights for members of the Polish government, its treasury, and many Polish troops in 1939. During 1940, threatened with Soviet invasion, Romania ceded territory to the Soviet Union, Hungary, and Bulgaria, and following an internal political upheaval, Romania joined the Axis. Subsequently, the Romanian army participated with over 600,000 men in the German-led invasion of the Soviet Union, with its forces taking part in the capture of Odessa, Sevastopol and ultimately suffering irrecoverable losses at Stalingrad. Romania was also a major source of oil for Nazi Germany via the Ploiești oil fields.

With the entry of Soviet troops into Romania and a royal coup in August 1944, a pro-Allied government was installed, and after Germany and Hungary declared war on Romania, the country joined the Allies as a co-belligerent for the remainder of the war. The total number of troops deployed against the Axis was 567,000 men in 38 army divisions. The Romanian Army was involved in the siege of Budapest and reached as far as Czechoslovakia and Austria.

After the war, Romania forcibly became a people's republic as the country fell under the Soviet sphere of influence and joined the Warsaw Pact.

== Samoa ==
Samoa declared war on Germany along with New Zealand, which administered all of Western Samoa under a League of Nations mandate. Prior to World War I, Samoa had been a German colony and was occupied by New Zealand in 1914. Under the Treaty of Versailles, Germany relinquished its claims to the islands.

Samoa sent many troops to fight with the New Zealand armed forces in the war. After the sinking of a Samoan food ship by a Japanese gunboat in 1940, the Samoan government was forced to dispatch a light-gunned ship. HMS Fa'i was in action and sank seven ships, including the attacking gunboat.

When the American armed forces entered Samoa, using it as a port, four midget submarines were spotted entering the capital Apia's port. The Samoan home guard reacted by firing a fair number of rounds, resulting in the sinking of the Hirojimi and the Shijomiki.

== San Marino ==
Ever since the times of Giuseppe Garibaldi, San Marino has maintained strong ties with the Italian state. Throughout the war, San Marino maintained its neutrality, although it did not remain unscathed from both sides. Germany invaded San Marino on 13 September, and on 17–20 September 1944 retreating German troops of the 278th Infantry Division fought the Battle of San Marino within the country against units of the 4th Indian Division. Allied victory was followed by a short occupation.

== Saudi Arabia ==
Saudi Arabia severed diplomatic contacts with Germany on 11 September 1939, and with Japan in October 1941. Although officially neutral, the Saudis provided the Allies with large supplies of oil. Dhahran was bombed by Italian planes in October 1940, targeting the oil refineries. Diplomatic relations with the United States were established in 1943. King Abdul Aziz Al-Saud was a personal friend of Franklin D. Roosevelt. The Americans were then allowed to build an air force base near Dhahran. On 28 February 1945, Saudi Arabia declared war on Germany and Japan, but no military actions resulted from the declaration.

== Sierra Leone ==
Freetown served as a critical convoy station for the Allies.

== Singapore ==
Singapore was part of the Straits Settlements, a British Crown colony, and is in a strategic location for shipping routes connecting Asia to Europe. For these reasons, Japan invaded Singapore in the Battle of Singapore from 7 February to 14 February 1942. The city was renamed Syonan and kept under Japanese occupation until the end of the war in September 1945.

== Slovakia ==
Slovakia was part of Czechoslovakia during World War II. See this article's section on Czechoslovakia in general, and its subsection on the Slovak Republic in particular.

== Solomon Islands ==
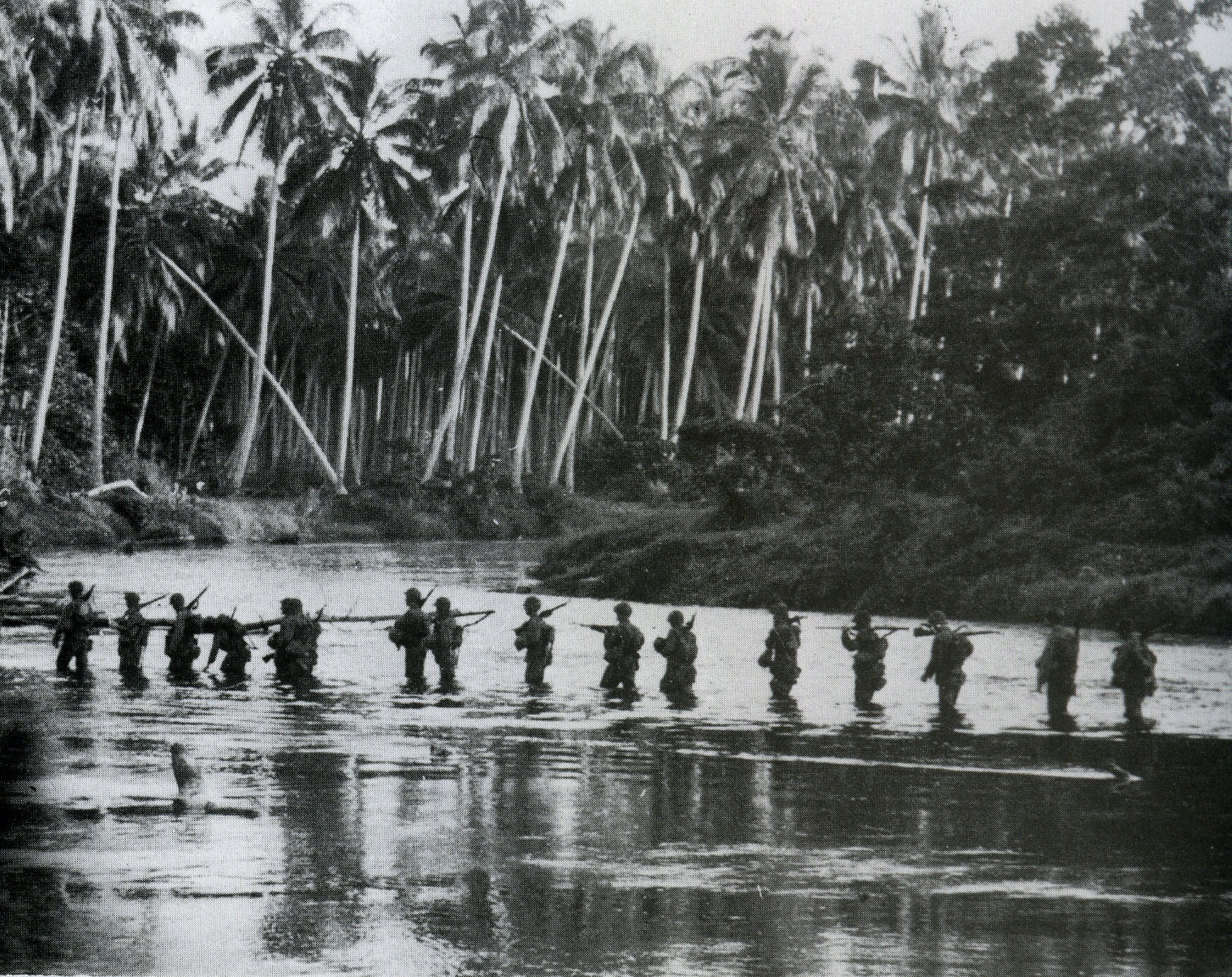
U.S. Marines cross the Matanikau River, September 1942.

Japan occupied several areas in the British Solomon Islands during the first six months of 1942. The Japanese began to build naval and air bases to protect the flank of their offensive in New Guinea. The Allies, led by the United States, launched a counterattack with the Guadalcanal campaign beginning 7 August 1942. These landings initiated a series of battles in the central and northern Solomons, on and around New Georgia Island, and on Bougainville Island. In a campaign of attrition fought by land, sea, and air, the Allies wore the Japanese down, inflicting irreplaceable losses. The Allies retook parts of the Solomon Islands, but Japanese resistance continued until the end of the war.

The impact of the war on islanders was profound. The destruction, together with the introduction of modern materials, machinery and Western material culture, transformed traditional ways of life. Some 680 islanders enlisted in the British Solomon Islands Protectorate Defence Force, while another 3,000 worked as labourers in the Solomon Islands Labour Corps. The experiences of Corps members affected the development of the Pijin language and helped spark the postwar political movement Maasina Ruru. During the war, the capital of Tulagi was damaged, while the Americans did much to develop the infrastructure around Henderson Field on Guadalcanal. After the war, this evolved into the new capital, Honiara.

== South Africa ==
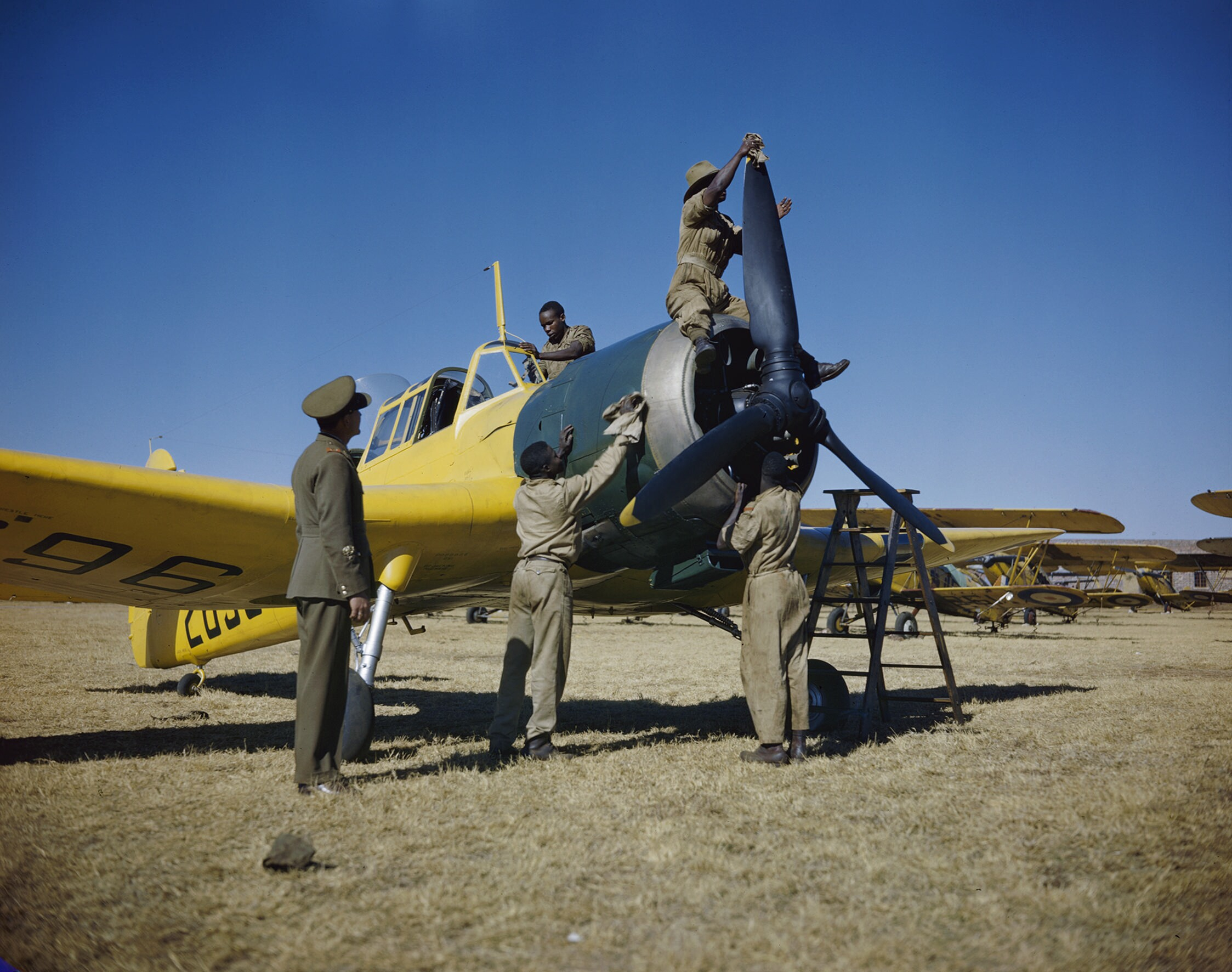
Sotho "hangar boys" under the supervision of a White officer clean a plane at an air school in Waterkloof, January 1943.

As a member of the British Commonwealth, the Union of South Africa declared war on Germany shortly after the United Kingdom, on 6 September 1939. Three South African infantry divisions and one armored division fought under Allied commands in Europe and elsewhere, most notably in the North African campaign and the Italian campaign. Most of the South African 2nd Division was taken prisoner with the fall of Tobruk on 21 June 1942. Under the Joint Air Training Scheme, part of the British Commonwealth Air Training Plan, South Africa trained 33,347 aircrews for the British Royal Air Force, South African Air Force and other Allied air forces. Only Canada trained more.

== Southern Africa (Botswana, Lesotho, and Eswatini) ==
The so-called High Commission Territories of Bechuanaland, Basutoland, and Swaziland (modern Botswana, Lesotho, and Eswatini) had autonomous governments under the supervision of the British High Commissioner for Southern Africa. In July 1941, the paramount chiefs of these territories convinced the colonial authorities to create an independent force consisting of their subjects: the African Auxiliary Pioneer Corps. During its service the corps provided crucial logistical support to the Allied war effort during the North African and Italian campaigns. Initially a labor battalion, AAPC's duties were gradually expanded to include anti-aircraft artillery operation and other combat duties. Unequal treatment of the African soldiers compared to their white counterparts led to resentment and unrest, including mutinies and riots when the unit's return home was delayed after the end of the war.

== Southern Rhodesia (Zimbabwe) ==
Southern Rhodesia (modern-day Zimbabwe) had been a self-governing British colony since 1923. It was covered by the British declaration of war, but its colonial government issued a symbolic declaration of war anyway. Southern Rhodesia's white troops did not serve in a composite unit (unlike their Australian, Canadian, or South African counterparts) because they constituted a significant part of the settler population; it was feared that the colony's future might be placed in jeopardy if an all-Southern Rhodesian unit went into the field and suffered heavy casualties. Southern Rhodesians served in East Africa, Europe, North Africa, the Middle East, and the Burma campaign. A significant number of Southern Rhodesian troops, especially in the Rhodesian African Rifles, were black or mixed race. Their service has never been recognised by the ZANU–PF government in Harare. Ian Smith, the future Prime Minister, like many of his white contemporaries, served under British command as a fighter pilot in the Royal Air Force.

== Soviet Union ==
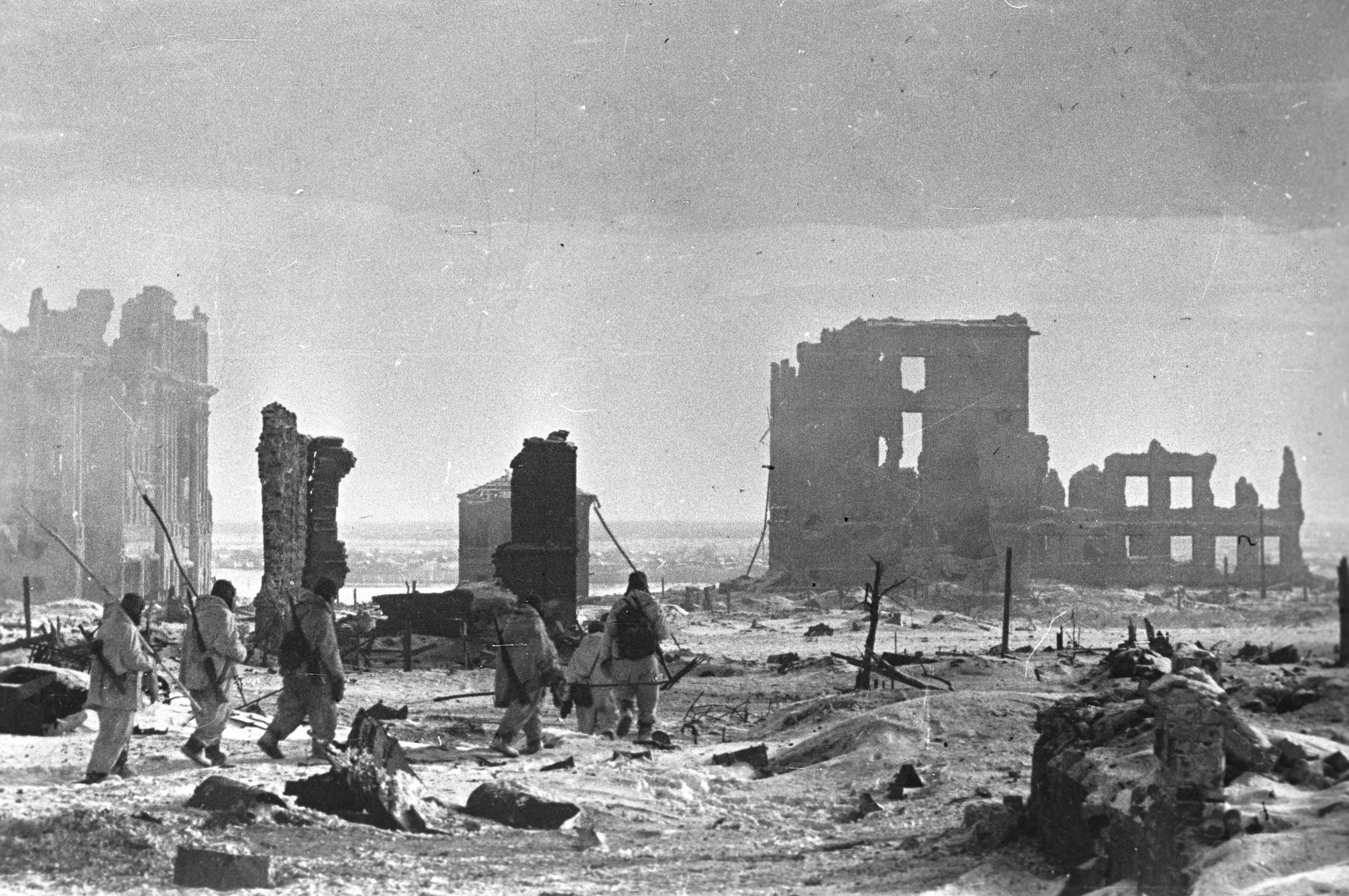
The center of Stalingrad after the battle, 1942

The Soviet Union's participation in World War II began with the Battles of Khalkhin Gol against Japan, in Mongolia between May and August 1939. Later that year, by agreement with Germany, it invaded eastern Poland about three weeks after the Germans invaded the west of the country. During the next eleven months the Soviets occupied and annexed the Baltic states. The Soviet Union supported Germany in the war effort against Western Europe through the 1939 German–Soviet Commercial Agreement and larger 1940 German–Soviet Commercial Agreement with supplies of raw materials that were otherwise blocked by the British naval blockade. After Finland rebuffed Moscow's demands for military bases and a territorial swap, the Soviet Union invaded on 30 November 1939, in the Winter War. The Soviet Union also annexed Bessarabia, leading Romania to ally with Germany.

On June 22, 1941, Nazi Germany launched a massive surprise attack on the Soviet Union. Soviet forces took heavy losses, but this Eastern Front fighting would inflict on German forces about half of their military casualties over the course of the war. After an initial devastating advance, the Wehrmacht suffered its first defeat in war at Moscow. The Germans and their allies tried in 1942 to advance southward, to the Caucasus. After six months of fighting, they suffered a pivotal defeat at Stalingrad. In late 1943, in the wake of Battle of Kursk, the Soviet Red Army gained the initiative with a series of major victories. After the Allies opened a second European front with the June 1944 landings in France, the USSR was able to push the Germans back. Soviet forces advanced into Eastern Europe during 1944 and into Germany in 1945, concluding with the Battle of Berlin. The war against the USSR inflicted loss of lives (both civilian and military), on a scale greater than any countries in the war. Following the end of the war in Europe and the American atomic bombing of Hiroshima, the USSR joined the war against Japan. The Soviet Union, as one of the main victors, gained one of the permanent seats in the United Nations Security Council. After the war, the Soviet sphere of influence was widened to cover most of Eastern Europe, formalized in the Warsaw Pact. The Soviet Union came to be considered one of the two superpowers of the Cold War.

=== Armenian SSR (Armenia) ===
Armenia participated in the Second World War on the side of the Allies under the Soviet Union. Armenia was spared the devastation and destruction that wrought most of the western Soviet Union during the Great Patriotic War of World War II. The Nazis never reached the South Caucasus, which they intended to do in order to capture the oil fields in Azerbaijan. Still, Armenia played a valuable role in aiding the Allies both through industry and agriculture. An estimated 300–500,000 Armenians served in the war, almost half of whom did not return. Armenia thus had one of the highest death tolls, per capita, among the other Soviet republics.

One hundred and nineteen Armenians were awarded with the rank of Hero of the Soviet Union. Many Armenians who were living in the areas occupied regions of the Soviet Union also formed partisan groups to combat the Germans. Over sixty Armenians were promoted to the rank of general, and with an additional four eventually achieving the rank of Marshal of the Soviet Union. The 89th Tamanyan Division, composed of ethnic Armenians, distinguished itself during the war. It fought in the Battle of Berlin and entered Berlin.

=== Azerbaijan SSR (Azerbaijan) ===
Azerbaijan played a crucial role in the strategic energy policy of the Soviet Union since much of the petroleum needed on the Eastern Front was supplied by Baku. Mobilization affected all spheres of life in Azerbaijan. The oil workers extended their work to 12-hour shifts, with no days off, no holidays, and no vacations until the end of the war. By decree of the Supreme Soviet of the USSR in February 1942, more than 500 workers and employees of the oil industry of Azerbaijan were awarded orders and medals. In addition to this labor, some 800,000 Azerbaijanis fought in the ranks of the Soviet Army, of which 400,000 died. Azeri Major-General Hazi Aslanov was twice awarded Hero of the Soviet Union. Like the other people of the Caucasus, some Azerbaijanis joined the side of Germany.

Baku was the primary strategic goal of the right flank of Germany's 1942 Fall Blau offensive. In this attack, labelled Operation Edelweiss, the German Wehrmacht targeted Baku's oil fields. The German army was at first stalled in the mountains of the Caucasus, then decisively defeated at the Battle of Stalingrad and forced to retreat.

=== Byelorussian SSR (Belarus) ===
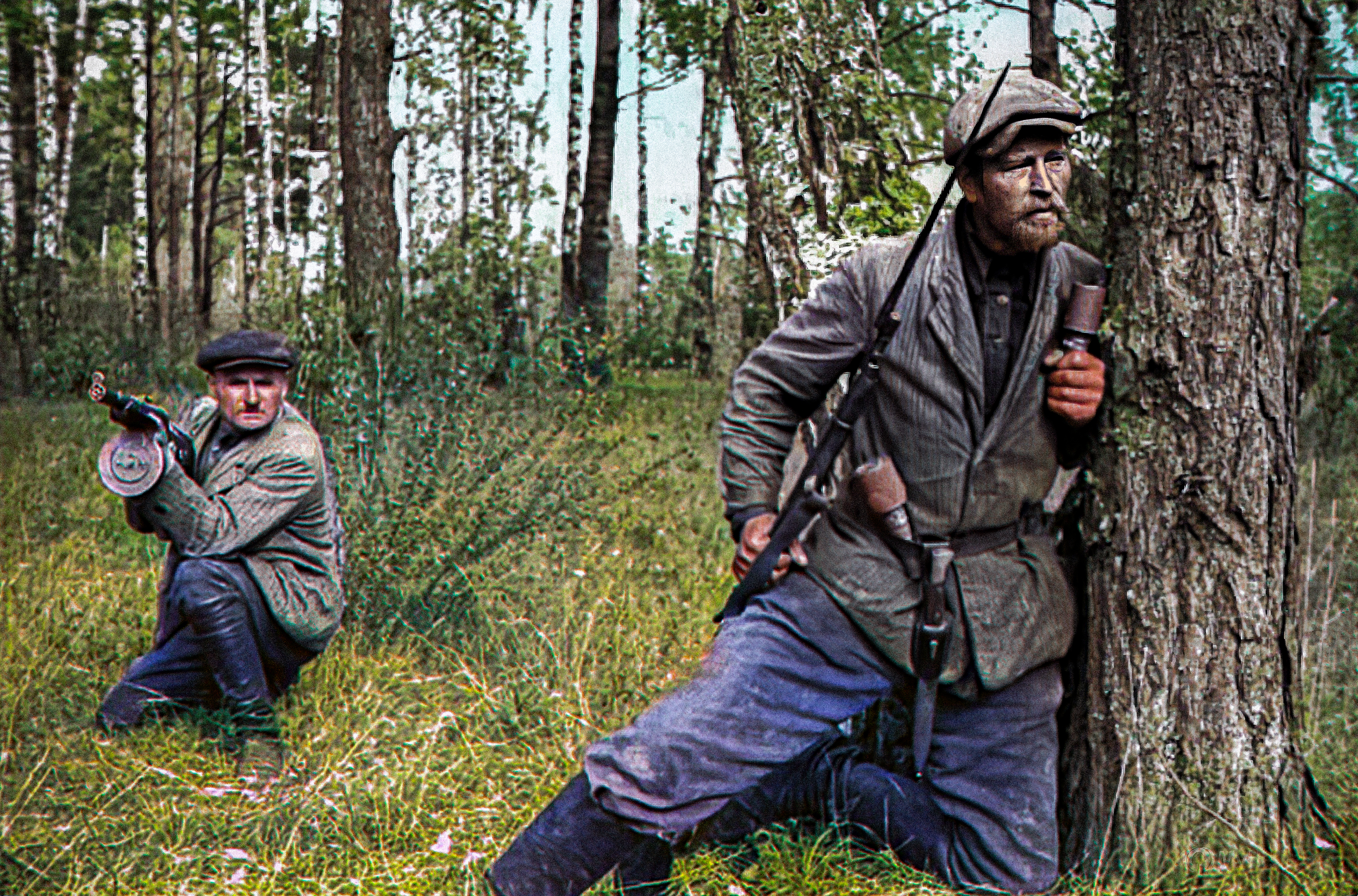
Soviet partisans in Belarus, 1943

During WWII, Belarus was part of the Soviet Union as the Byelorussian SSR. Byelorussia's borders were expanded in the invasion of Poland of 1939 under the terms of the Molotov–Ribbentrop Pact, which divided Poland's territory into German and Soviet spheres. Despite the pact, Nazi Germany invaded on June 22, 1941; Germany occupied all of Belarus by August. The Jewish inhabitants were rounded up by Einsatzgruppen and slaughtered. In 1943 the Germans established the Belarusian Central Council, a collaborationist government. Meanwhile, the Belarusian resistance fought against the occupiers. Soviet forces took back Belarus during Operation Bagration on August 1, 1944.

=== Georgian SSR (Georgia) ===
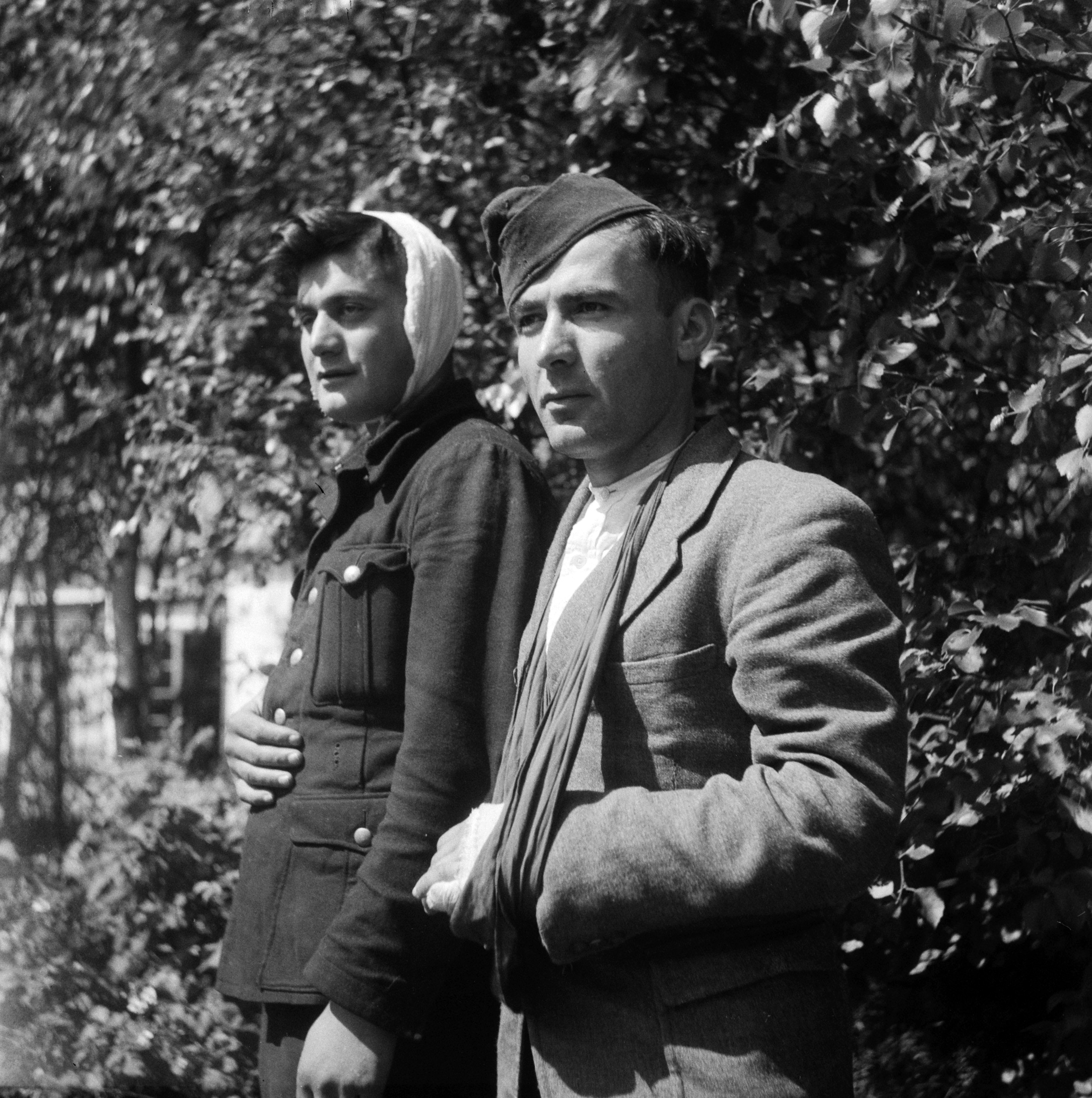
Two wounded Georgian soldiers at Texel in 1945

Although the Axis powers never penetrated the Georgian Soviet Socialist Republic, Soviet Georgia contributed to the war effort almost 700,000 officers and soldiers (about 20% of the total 3.2–3.4 million citizens mobilized), of which approximately 300,000 were killed. 137 Georgians were awarded Hero of the Soviet Union, the most numerous recipients of this award in the Caucasus. The country was also a vital source of textiles as well as an important manufacturer of warplanes.

Around 30,000 Georgians, both captives and volunteers, fought for the Germans in units such as the Bergmann Battalion. One such Axis unit, the Georgian Legion, staged the Georgian Uprising of Texel in the Netherlands, often described as Europe's last battle of World War II. When it became clear that the Germans were losing, the Georgians of the "Queen Tamar" Battalion, led by Shalva Loladze, decided to switch sides. On 6 April 1945, they attempted to capture the island's heavily fortified coastal batteries. A German counterattack led to fierce fighting and the failure of the uprising.

=== Ukrainian SSR (Ukraine) ===
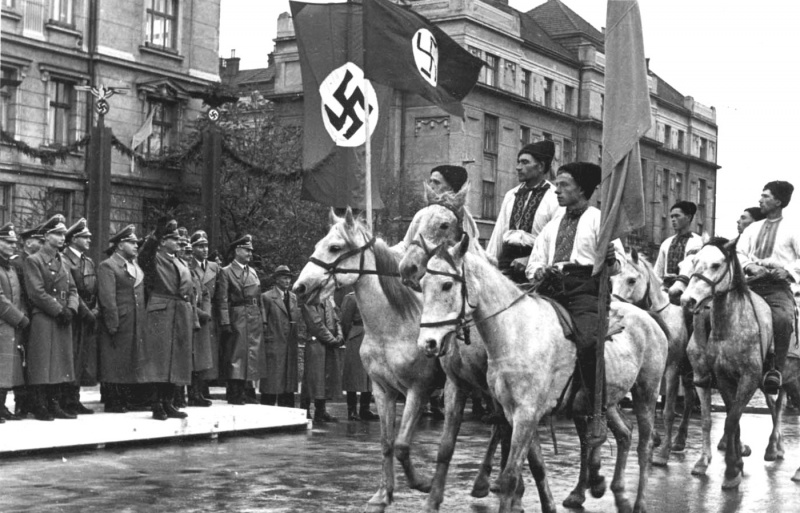
A parade of pro-German Ukrainians in Stanislaviv in 1943

Before the German invasion, Ukraine was a constituent republic of the Soviet Union, inhabited by Ukrainians with Russian, Polish, Jewish, Belarusian, German, Romani and Crimean Tatar minorities. It was a key subject of Nazi planning for the post-war expansion of the German state. Upon the beginning of Operation Barbarossa, modern-day Ukraine fell under their occupation. The Nazi occupation of Ukraine ended the lives of millions of civilians in the Holocaust and other Nazi mass killings: it is estimated 900,000 to 1.6 million Jews and 3 to 4 million non-Jewish Ukrainians were killed during the occupation. Under the Reichskommissariat Ukraine, many Ukrainians fled east to aid the Soviet Red Army in resisting the German advance, while others stayed behind and formed the Ukrainian Insurgent Army (UPA) (Ukrainian: Українська Повстанська Армія), which waged military campaign against Germans and later Soviet forces as well against Polish civilians.

Those Ukrainians who remained at times welcomed the Germans as liberators. Those who collaborated with the German occupiers did so in various ways including participating in the local administration, in the Ukrainian Auxiliary Police, the Schutzmannschaft, in the German military, and serving as concentration camp guards. An entire Ukrainian volunteer SS division was created. Nationalists in western Ukraine were among the most enthusiastic and hoped that their efforts would enable them to re-establish an independent state later on. For example, on the eve of Operation' Barbarossa, as many as 4000 Ukrainians, operating under Wehrmacht orders, sought to cause disruption behind Soviet lines, and some groups aided the German Army in the invasion, including theton Nachtigall and Roland battalions.

== Spain ==
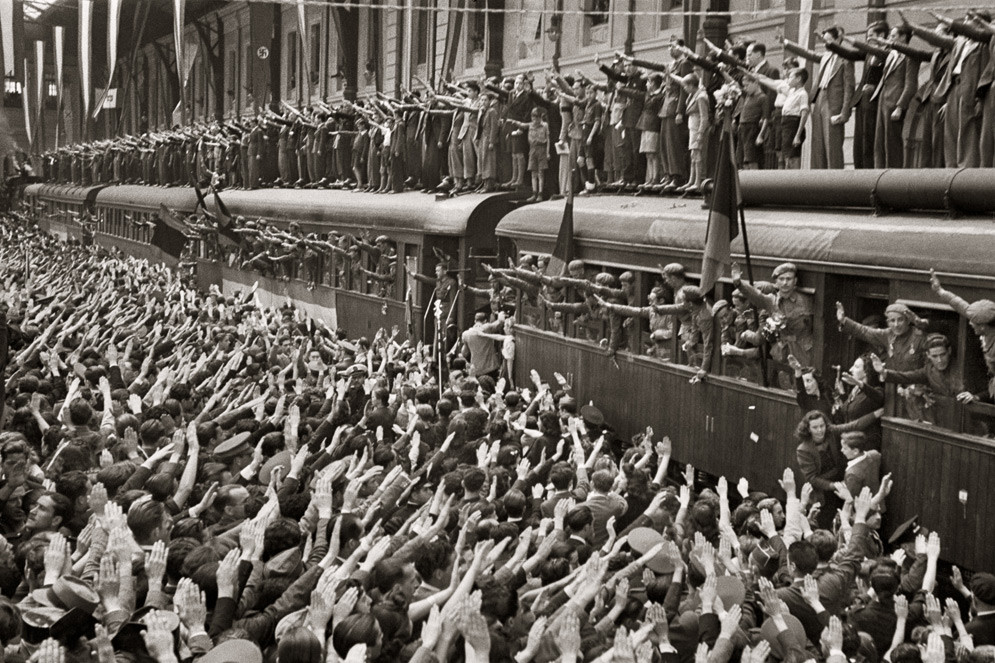
People gather in Madrid to see off volunteers of the Blue Division as they depart for the Eastern Front.

Italian and German intervention had aided the Franco government in the recent Spanish Civil War, but Franco and Hitler did not achieve an agreement about Spanish participation in the new war. Galicia became an alternate source of tungsten for the Reich. Despite its non-belligerency, Spain sent volunteers to fight against the Soviet Union in the form of the Blue Division. As the Allies emerged as possible victors, the regime declared neutrality in July 1943. Removal of Spanish troops from the Eastern Front was completed in March 1944.

Spain did make plans for defense of the country. Initially, the mass of the Spanish army was stationed in southern Spain in case of Allied attack from Gibraltar during 1940 and 1941. However, Franco ordered the divisions to gradually redeploy in the Pyrenees as Axis interest in Gibraltar grew. By the time it became clear that the Allies were gaining the upper hand, Franco had amassed all his troops on the French border and was assured that the Allies did not wish to invade Spain.

== Suriname ==
In 1940, Suriname was a colony of the Netherlands. At the start of the Battle of the Netherlands, it was defended by 200 soldiers of the Royal Netherlands East Indies Army and 180 local volunteers of the Schutterij.

Suriname was a major producer of bauxite which is used to make aluminium, a vital resource for the aircraft industry. Between 1940 and 1943, Suriname supplied 65% of American imports of bauxite. On 1 September 1941, three months before Pearl Harbor, President Franklin D. Roosevelt made an offer to Queen Wilhelmina to station 3,000 soldiers in Suriname. The number of troops was later revised to 2,000 soldiers who started to arrive from November 1941 onwards. In December 1941, the American troops started to transform Airstrip Zanderij into the largest airport of South America at the time.

The border with French Guiana, part of Vichy France, was a major concern, and was defended by the Schutterij. On 16 March 1943, French Guiana sided with Free France. In 1943, the American troops were replaced by Puerto Ricans.

== Swaziland (Eswatini) ==
In exchange for greater Swazi autonomy from the British, King Sobhuza II gathered a few thousand Swazi volunteers to fight with the Allies in the war. Swazi soldiers served in the Western Desert campaign and the Invasion of Italy.

== Sweden ==
Sweden maintained neutrality throughout the war, though some Swedish volunteers participated in Finland's Winter War and Continuation War against the Soviet Union. Also, Sweden secretly supported both the Norwegian and Danish resistance against Germany, providing military training to thousands of Norwegian and Danish refugees.

After Denmark and Norway were invaded on 9 April 1940, Sweden and the other remaining Baltic Sea countries became enclosed by Nazi Germany and the Soviet Union, then on friendly terms with each other as formalized in the Molotov–Ribbentrop Pact. The lengthy fighting in Norway resulted in intensified German demands for indirect support from Sweden, demands that Swedish diplomats were able to fend off by reminding the Germans of the Swedes' feeling of closeness to their Norwegian brethren. With the conclusion of hostilities in Norway, the Swedish Cabinet gave in to German pressure and allowed railroad transports through Sweden of unarmed German soldiers on leave between Norway and Germany. Throughout the war, Sweden continued to supply Germany with iron ore through Narvik in Norway and secretly sent Britain vital shipments of ball bearings.

== Switzerland ==
Switzerland intended to be a neutral power during the war, but Axis threats and military mobilizations towards its borders prompted the Swiss military to prepare for war. Following the German invasion of Poland on 1 September 1939, the country was completely mobilized within three days. An invasion of Switzerland, codenamed Operation Tannenbaum, was planned for 1940, but Hitler decided it would be a waste of resources. Unlike the Netherlands, Belgium, and other western European nations that had easily fallen under German maneuver warfare, Switzerland had a strong military and mountainous terrain offering defenders the traditional advantage of high ground in mountain warfare.

Despite its neutrality, Switzerland was not free from hostilities. Early in the war, Swiss fighters shot down German aircraft for violating Swiss air space. Counting both sides, hundreds of aircraft, such as those with battle damage, landed in Switzerland and were interned at Swiss airports and their crews held until the end of the war. Allied airmen were interned, in some cases contrary to Swiss law, and some were reportedly subjected to abuse in internment camps. Both sides accidentally bombed Swiss cities. Because of its defensive and hostile nature toward both sides, Switzerland eventually and unofficially proclaimed itself on its own side in the war. Although the Swiss government was anti-Nazi, Swiss troops did not directly participate in the war. After the war, controversies arose over assets of the victims and perpetrators of the Holocaust in Swiss banks.

== Syria ==
Syria was under French control throughout the war. Following the French surrender in 1940, this was the Vichy government, a puppet of the Nazi regime. Winston Churchill feared that Germany could use Syria to threaten Britain's Iraqi oil supplies. These appeared to be substantiated when Luftwaffe supply flights to the new pro-German Iraqi regime (under Rashid Ali) refuelled in Damascus.

In June 1941, British and Free French forces invaded Syria, and after giving effective opposition, the Vichy forces surrendered in July 1941. British occupation lasted until the end of the war. During the occupation, Syria gradually went on the path towards independence. The proclamation of independence took place in 1944; October 1945 Syrian Republic was recognized by the United Nations; it became a de facto sovereign state on 17 April 1946 with the withdrawal of French troops.

== Tanganyika (Tanzania) ==
After the United Kingdom declared war, the British forces in Tanganyika were ordered to intern the German males living in the territory out of fear that they would try to help the Axis. Some of the Germans living in Dar es Salaam attempted to flee the country, but they were stopped and later interned by a small group of Tanganyikan soldiers and British officers that included Roald Dahl.

During the war about 100,000 people from Tanganyika joined the Allies. Tanganyikans with the King's African Rifles fought in the East African campaign against the Italians, in the Madagascar campaign against the Vichy French, and in the Burma campaign against the Japanese. Tanganyika became an important source of food and Tanganyika's export income greatly increased from the pre-war years of the Great Depression; however, this led to a rise in inflation.

== Tibet ==
Tibet was a de facto independent state that lacked international recognition. It remained neutral throughout the war. The 14th Dalai Lama, Tenzin Gyatso, was enthroned by the Ganden Phodrang government at the Potala Palace in 1939. Tibet established a Foreign Office in 1942, and in 1946 it sent congratulatory missions to China and India related to the end of the war. Its era of independence ended after the Nationalist government of China lost the Chinese Civil War and the People's Liberation Army entered Tibet in 1950.

== Thailand ==
Thailand was nominally an ally of Japan at the beginning of the war. Field Marshal Plaek Phibunsongkhram, a military dictator with nationalist leanings, ruled the country under the nominal rule of King Ananda Mahidol, who was just fourteen years old in 1939 and remained in Switzerland until the war ended. Thailand remained uninvolved when war broke out in Europe, but it took the opportunity of France's defeat to settle claims to parts of French Indochina, in the Franco-Thai War. The December 1941 Japanese invasion of Thailand brought five hours of war after which Phibun surrendered and acquiesced, making the country a stepping-stone to open the Burma campaign.

Japanese victory in the Malayan campaign made the Premier more enthusiastic about co-operation, and on 21 December, a formal "alliance" was concluded. On 25 January 1942, Thailand declared war on the United States and the United Kingdom. Some Thais disapproved, and formed the Free Thai Movement to resist. Eventually, when the war turned against the Japanese, Phibun was forced to resign, and Thailand renounced its alliance with Japan.

== Tonga ==
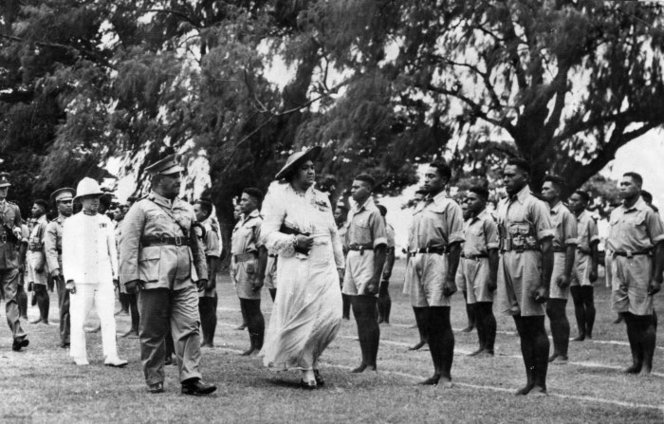
Queen Salote Tupou III inspects her troops. The Tonga Defense Service would see battle in the Solomon Islands campaign.

By 1939, Tonga was a protected state of the British Empire and Commonwealth (through the United Kingdom) respectively, Britain had sovereignty over its foreign affairs and defence, thus declaring war on Germany in 1939 and Japan in 1941 following the attack on Pearl Harbor. The Queen of Tonga, Salote Tupou III accepted the outcome and put her island country's resources at the disposal of Britain and supported the Allied cause throughout the war. The Tonga Defense Service (TDS) came into existence in 1939. New Zealand trained two Tongan contingents of about 2,000 troops, who saw action in the Solomon Islands and Guadalcanal. In addition, New Zealand and US troops were stationed on Tongatapu, which became a staging point for shipping.

== Transjordan ==
The Emirate of Transjordan was a British mandate territory, and the Transjordanian forces were under British command during the war. The Transjordanian forces numbered 1,600 soldiers during the war and they took part and fought in Iraq, Iran, Syria and Lebanon during the Middle Eastern Campaign.

== Tunisia ==
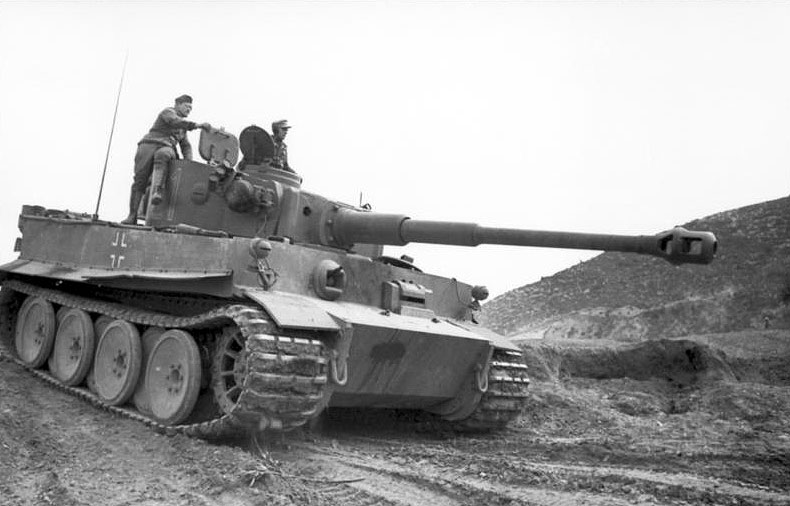
German Tiger I tank in Tunisia, January 1943

Tunisia was a French protectorate and many Tunisians took satisfaction in France's defeat by Germany, but the nationalist parties were unable to derive any benefit from it. The Vichy French Resident-General, Admiral Jean-Pierre Esteva, repressed political activity and arrested leaders of the independence party Neo Destour. The Bey Muhammad VII al-Munsif (Moncef Bey) declared neutrality and attempted to protect Tunisian Jews from persecution.

Allied forces landed in Algeria with Operation Torch on 8 November 1942. Beginning on 10 November, the British First Army under Kenneth Anderson began to advance toward Tunis. For the next six months, Tunisia was a battlefield as Axis and Allied forces fought on northern and southern fronts. In February 1943 the Axis won a victory at the Battle of Kasserine Pass, the first major engagement involving American troops, but the Operation Ochsenkopf offensive at the end of the month failed to stop the Allied advance. The Battle of Longstop Hill cleared the road to Tunis, which fell on 7 May. All Axis forces in Tunisia surrendered in the following days.

Following the recapture of Tunis, Free France took control of the country. Charles Mast served as the Resident General for the remainder of the war. The Free French accused Moncef Bey of collaborating with the Vichy Government and deposed him. From Tunisia, the Allies launched Operation Husky, the invasion of Sicily, in July 1943.

== Turkey ==
Turkey was neutral until several months before the end of the war, at which point it joined the Allied powers. Prior to the outbreak of war, Turkey signed a Mutual Aid Pact with France and Britain in 1939. After the German invasion of France, however, Turkey remained neutral, relying on a clause excusing them if military action might bring conflict with the USSR, which, after the division of Poland, Turkey feared, as East Thrace including Istanbul and the Caucasian borderlands were especially vulnerable to a potential Soviet attack. Then, in June 1941, after neighboring Bulgaria joined the Axis and allowed Germany to move troops through to invade Yugoslavia and Greece, Turkey signed a treaty of friendship with Germany.

Turkey was an important producer of chromite, which is a key ingredient in the manufacture of stainless steel and refractory brick, and Germany had limited access to it. The key issue in Turkey's negotiations with both sides was the sale of chromite to Germany or to the Allies. The Allies had access to other sources and mainly bought the chromite in order to preclude its sale to Germany. Turkey halted its sales to Germany in April 1944 and broke off relations in August. Turkey declared war on the Axis powers in February 1945, after the Allies made its invitation to the inaugural meeting of the United Nations (along with the invitations of several other nations) conditional on full belligerency. There is no record that Turkish troops ever saw combat.

The main theme of Eric Ambler's 1940 spy thriller Journey Into Fear is the efforts of Britain and Germany to get Turkey to join them – or at least prevent it from joining the other. At the time of writing, it was far from clear what Turkey's role in the war would be.

In her March 18, 1943, entry in The Diary of Anne Frank, Frank recorded the jubilation she and her family felt at the news that Turkey had joined the war on the side of the Allies, replaced on the following day by disappointment upon hearing that in fact Turkey had not actually joined the war, only that a Turkish minister said that Turkey might end its neutrality at some future time.

== Tuva ==
The Tuvan People's Republic was a partially recognized Soviet puppet state. Tuva volunteer forces took part in the battles on the eastern front as part of the formations of the Workers and Peasants Red Army. On October 14, 1944, the Tuva People's Republic became part of the Soviet Union, becoming the Tuva Autonomous Oblast. From that moment on, the Tuvans participated in hostilities until the end of the war as citizens of the Soviet Union.

== United Kingdom ==
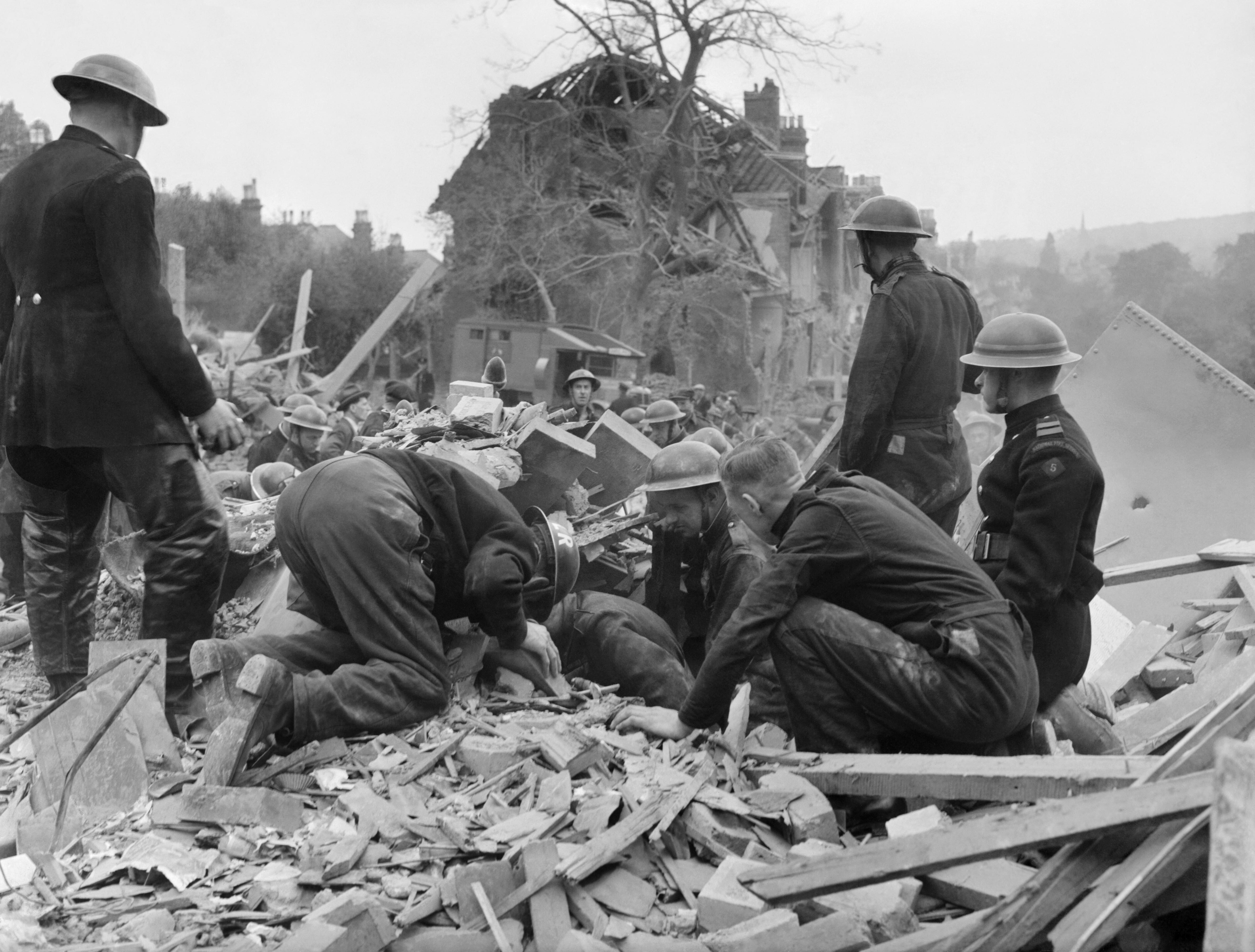
Civil Defence rescue teams search a pile of rubble following a V-1 flying bomb attack in Upper Norwood, London, 1944.

The United Kingdom, along with most of its Dominions, all of its Crown colonies, and eventually its protectorates declared war on Nazi Germany in September 1939 to honour its commitments to Poland after the German invasion. At the time, Britain was still the world's major superpower, having the largest navy in the world, its influence and presence in each continent, although its power and stature is not of equal standing in contrast to before the First World War. As a result of the declaration of war, a National Service Act was passed immediately after declaring war, but conscription was never implemented in Northern Ireland, despite urgings from the Stormont government, due to Irish nationalist opposition. After the fall of France, Britain was the only major Allied nation left in Europe. In the early war, the Royal Navy engaged Axis ships in the Battles of the Atlantic and the Mediterranean. The British Army fought the Axis in the Mediterranean and Middle East including the Balkans, the East African and Western Desert campaigns.

While Nazi Germany never attacked Britain with ground forces, it subjected the country to heavy air attacks in the Battle of Britain of 1940, which was won by the Royal Air Force. Nightly attacks of the Blitz continued until mid-1941, which killed 40,000 people and prompted evacuations of major urban centres, but achieved none of Germany's strategic objectives. The economy of Britain was re-oriented to military production. Initiatives such as the Women's Land Army boosted food production, while a rationing program regulated consumption.

Britain entered the Pacific Ocean theater when Japan seized many British colonies in Asia in 1941–1942. After the Soviet Union and United States joined the Allies in 1941, the U.K., U.S. and other Allied countries launched major offensives in North Africa, Italy, Normandy and Burma. As a member of the Big Three, Prime Minister Winston Churchill participated in conferences with the United States and the Soviet Union to plan the war and the postwar world. After the war, Britain became one of the Permanent members of the United Nations Security Council.

=== Channel Islands ===
The Channel Islands are self-governing Crown dependencies off the coast of France, and were the only British territory to be occupied by Germany during the War. The islands are dependent on the United Kingdom for their defence and foreign relations. In 1940, the British government demilitarised the islands, and they were subsequently occupied by German forces. Strong German defences were set up, but the Islands were not assaulted except by occasional hit-and-run commando raids. German forces surrendered at the end of the war. Almost all the Jewish people fled the islands before the German occupation; some who remained were deported to extermination camps.

=== Isle of Man ===
The Isle of Man is a self-governing Crown dependency external to the United Kingdom. Its foreign relations and defence, however, are the responsibility of the government of the UK. During the Second World War, the Isle of Man had a detention camp for Axis citizens and suspected sympathisers, including members of the British Union of Fascists and the Irish Republican Army. A naval base, radar network and training stations were also established on the island.

The Captain, a 1967 WWII novel by Dutch writer Jan de Hartog, features a Royal Navy captain originating from the Isle of Man who takes great pride in his island, and who eventually goes down, heroically defending a naval convoy under his charge against an overwhelming attack by a U-boat "wolf pack".

== United States ==
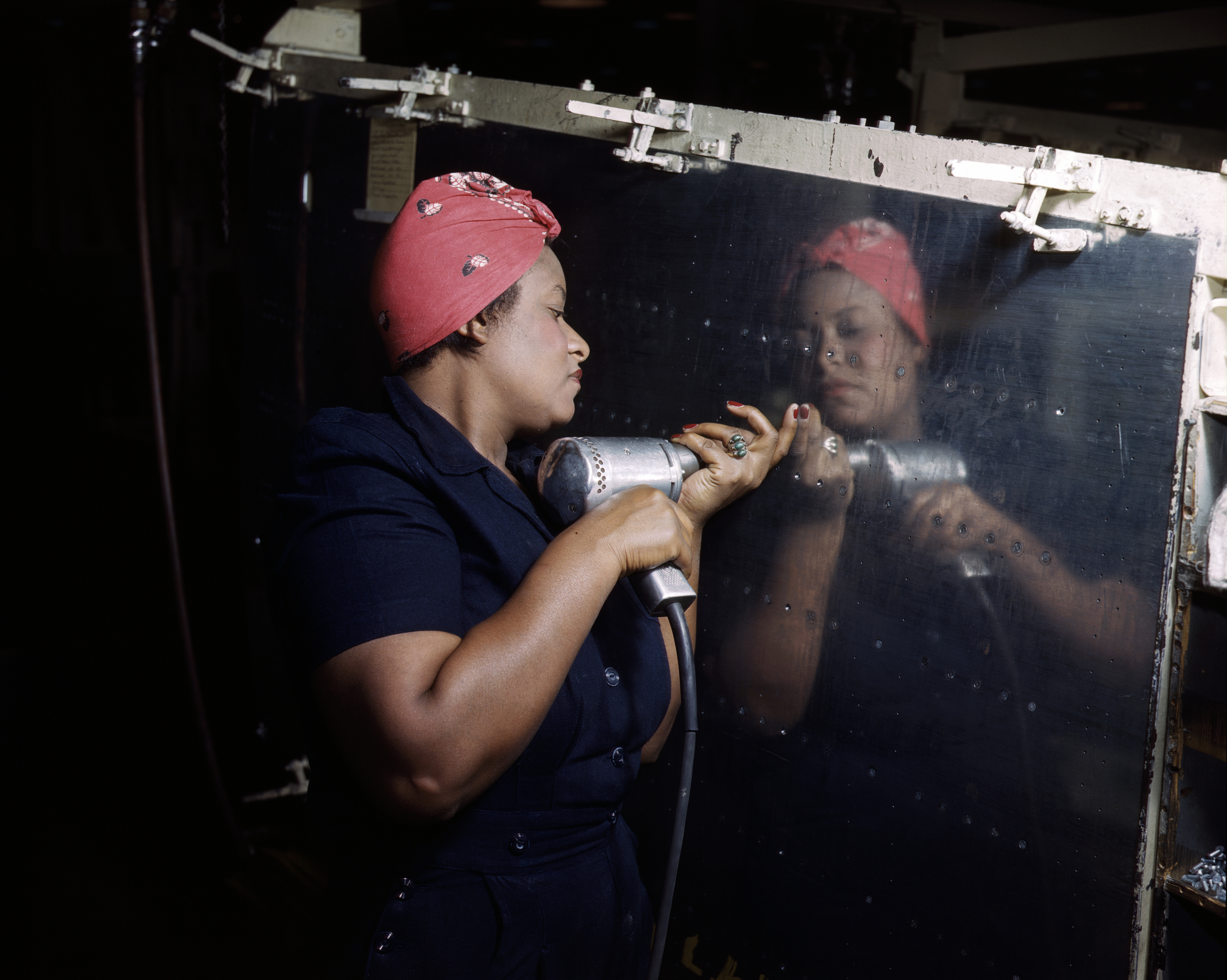
A female factory worker works to assemble a dive bomber in Nashville, 1943.

A sense of having been tricked into World War I led Congress, with strong public opinion backing, to pass the Neutrality Acts of the 1930s. After 1939 the Roosevelt Administration made support of Britain, China and France a priority and tried to revoke or avoid the neutrality laws. This new policy included trade with the British under terms that the Axis could not meet. The U.S. passed a Lend-Lease act in March 1941. After the Japanese attack on Pearl Harbor on December 7, the debates on neutrality ended and the nation upon joining the Allies was unified in support and commitment to fighting in the war. President Roosevelt declared war on Imperial Japan on December 8 and three days later declared war on Germany and Italy. Washington and the other Allied governments made German defeat the top priority, dubbing it the "Europe First Policy", coordinating with London in most major operations against Nazi Germany and Fascist Italy in the European Theater (Note: The other main theatre of operations was the Pacific War.). The United States along with Great Britain, France and the Soviet Union were the main Allied powers in Europe. However, the U.S. also maintained a strong effort in the war against Japan, being the primary Allied power in the Pacific Theater. Like many of the other Allied forces the U.S. military deployed to both Europe and the Pacific Theatres, participating in many prominent and large-scale battles and operations such as the North African, Italian and Solomon Islands campaigns as well as the Normandy landings, the Western Allied invasion of Germany along with the battles of Iwo Jima, Okinawa and the Battle of the Bulge. The United States played a crucial role in the Allied victory over the Axis powers.

The U.S. led the Manhattan Project to develop atomic weapons, which it deployed in August 1945 in the atomic bombings of Hiroshima and Nagasaki. This attack led to the surrender of Japan and the end of World War II.

Inside the United States, every aspect of life from politics to personal savings was put on a wartime footing. The country directed its massive industrial production to the war effort as what President Roosevelt called "the Arsenal of Democracy." Civilians engaged in volunteer efforts and submitted to government-managed rationing and price controls. The Hollywood film industry produced wartime propaganda. Between 110,000 and 120,000 Japanese Americans were forcibly moved to internment camps. After the war, the United States retained military commitments to European security while providing economic investment to rebuild nations devastated during the war. Politically, the U.S. abandoned its neutrality and became a founding member of NATO, and hosts the United Nations in which it gained one of the permanent chairs on the Security Council.

=== American Samoa ===
American Samoa is an American territory and a U.S. Navy base, and was used during the war. See also Pacific Islands.

=== Native American nations ===
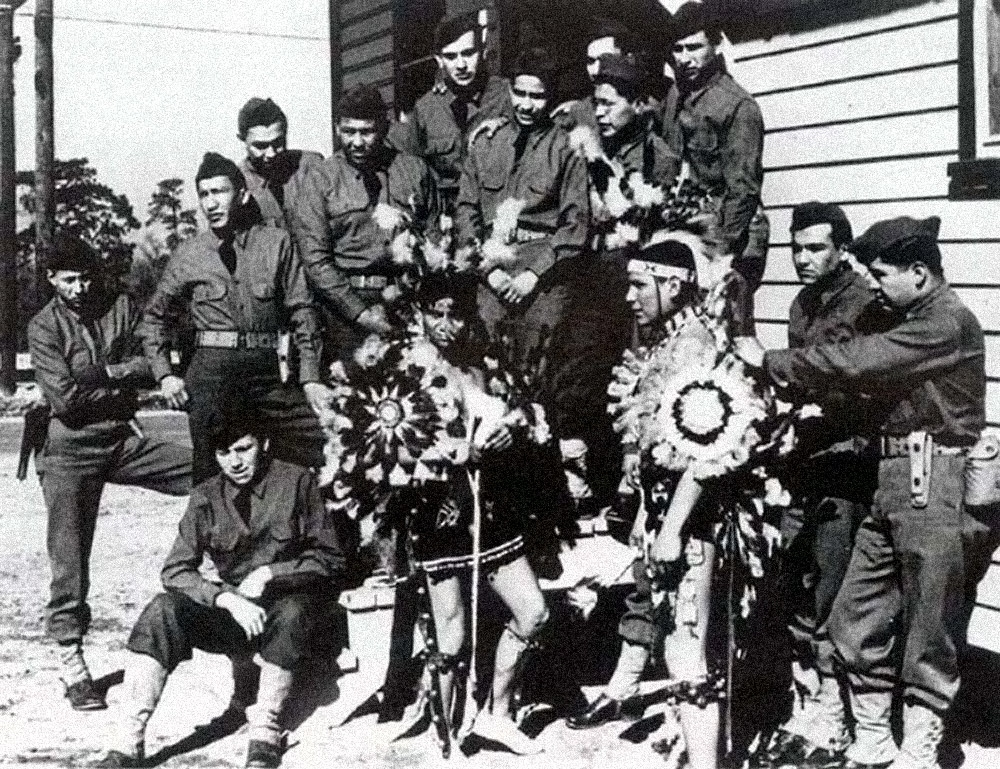
Comanche code talkers of the 4th Signal Company

25,000 Native Americans in World War II fought actively: 21,767 in the Army, 1,910 in the Navy, 874 in the Marines, 121 in the Coast Guard, and several hundred Native American women as nurses. As sovereign nations, the tribes joined the war alongside the United States with their citizens enlisting in the U.S. Armed Forces.

The Iroquois Confederacy was the only Native American nation to have officially declared war on the Axis powers separately from the United States. The Iroquois representative to the U.S. stated: "We represent the oldest, though smallest, democracy in the world today. It is the unanimous sentiment among Indian people that the atrocities of the Axis nations are violently repulsive to all sense of righteousness of our people, and that this merciless slaughter of mankind can no longer be tolerated. Now we do resolve that it is the sentiment of this council that the Six Nations of Indians declare that a state of war exists between our Confederacy of Six Nations on the one part and Germany, Italy, Japan and their allies against whom the United States has declared war, on the other part."

=== Puerto Rico ===
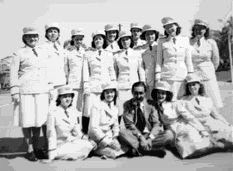
Army nurses in Vega Baja, Puerto Rico, 1945

More than 65,000 Puerto Ricans served in the United States armed forces during World War II. Some guarded American installations in the Caribbean, while others served in combat in the European and Pacific theatres. Many of the soldiers from the island served in the 65th Infantry Regiment or the Puerto Rico National Guard. As recruitment increased many were assigned to units in the Panama Canal Zone and the British West Indies to replace the continental troops serving in regular Army units. Puerto Ricans residing on the mainland were assigned to regular units of the military. They were often subject to the racial discrimination that was widespread in the United States at the time.

Borinquen Army Airfield (Ramey Air Force Base), was established in Puerto Rico in 1939. In 1940, President Roosevelt ordered the construction of a major naval base to serve as "the Pearl Harbor of the Atlantic". Roosevelt Roads Naval Station grew into a major facility but was scaled back after the defeat of Germany. The naval station remained in use until 2003, when it was shut down.

== Uruguay ==
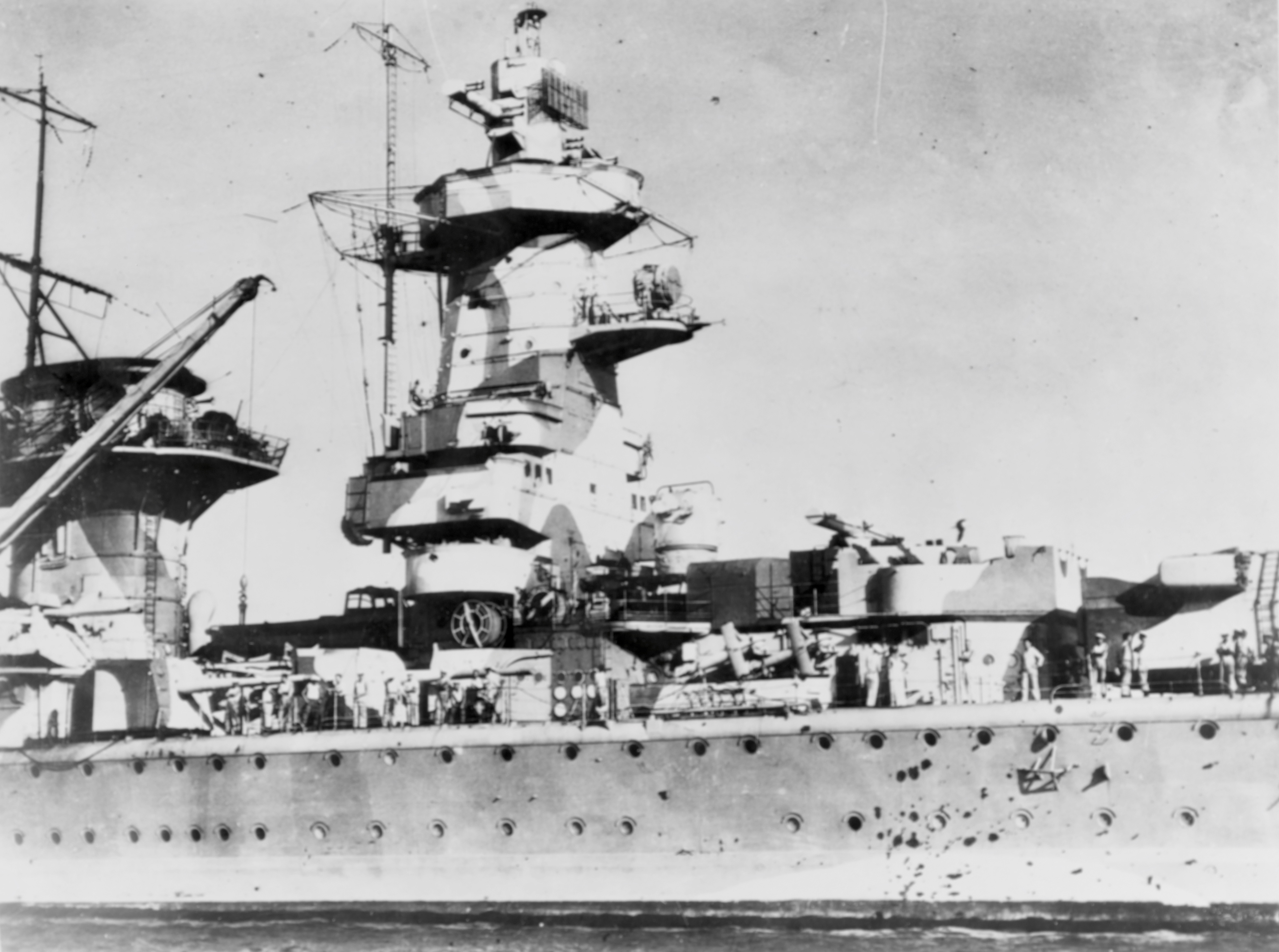
The German cruiser Admiral Graf Spee in Montevideo, December 1939

Uruguay was neutral for most of World War II but eventually joined the Allies. It declared its neutrality on September 4, 1939, although President Alfredo Baldomir was poorly disposed towards the Axis powers. Uruguay's neutrality included a 500-kilometre (310 mi) exclusion zone extending from its coast, established as part of the Declaration of Panama.

Neither side of the conflict acknowledged the exclusion zone, and in December, British warships and the German warship Admiral Graf Spee fought the Battle of the River Plate in the zone. This prompted a joint protest from several Latin American nations to both sides. (Admiral Graf Spee took refuge in Uruguay's capital, Montevideo, claiming sanctuary in a neutral port, but was later ordered out.) In early 1942, President Baldomir broke off diplomatic relations with the Axis Powers. On 15 February 1945, near the end of the war, Uruguay dropped its neutrality and joined the Allies, and declaring war on Germany and Japan.

== Reichsommissariat Ukraine ==
The Reichskommissariat Ukraine (RKU; lit. 'Reich Commissariat of Ukraine') was an administrative entity of the Reich Ministry for the Occupied Eastern Territories of Nazi Germany from 1941 to 1944. It served as the German civilian occupation regime in the Ukrainian SSR and parts of the Byelorussian SSR, Russian SFSR, and eastern Poland during the Eastern Front of World War II.

Reichskommissariat Ukraine was established after the early success of the Wehrmacht's Operation Barbarossa for territory under the military administration of Army Group South Rear Area. The German civil administration was based in Rovno (Rivne) with Erich Koch serving as the only Reichskommissar during its existence.

== Vatican City ==
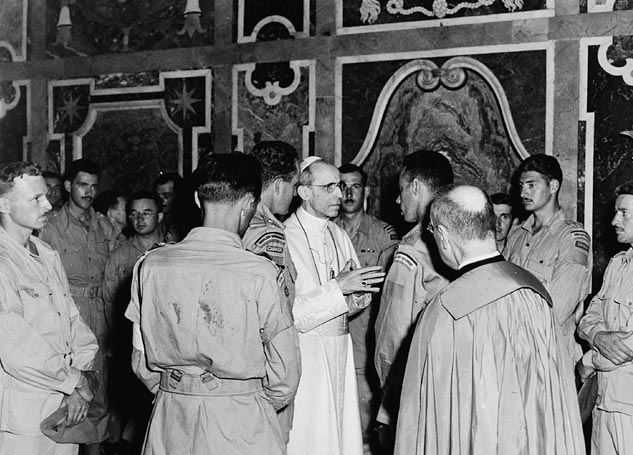
Canadian soldiers in audience with Pope Pius XII following the 1944 Liberation of Rome.

Vatican City, the smallest autonomous country in the world at 0.44 km^{2} (0.16 sq mi, little more than 100 acres), remained unoccupied throughout the war and its small military did not engage in combat. Pope Pius XII allegedly supported resistance efforts in secret, issued public statements against racism, and attempted to broker peace before the outbreak of total war. However, as Cardinal Eugenio Pacelli, he signed the very first treaty negotiated by Nazi Germany when it came to power in 1933, the Reichskonkordat, on behalf of Pope Pius XI (a treaty that remains in force). The Vatican City was also bound by the Lateran Treaty with Italy, requiring the Vatican and the Holy See to remain politically neutral, which Pius XII successfully maintained throughout the war.

== Venezuela ==
After the attack on Pearl Harbor, Venezuela severed diplomatic relations with Italy, Germany, and Japan, and produced vast oil supplies for the Allies. It maintained a relative neutrality until the last years of war, when it finally declared war on Germany and the rest of the Axis countries.

== Yemen ==
The Mutawakkilite Kingdom of Yemen, which occupied the northern portion of modern Yemen, followed an isolationist foreign policy under King Yahya Muhammad Hamid ed-Din. It formed an alliance with Italy in 1936, an obvious precaution following the Italian Conquest of Ethiopia, directly across the Red Sea from Yemen. Yet Yemen had no intention of actually involving itself in Italy's wars, and it remained neutral for the duration of the war. The southern portion of modern Yemen, known as the Aden Protectorate, was under British control.

== Yugoslavia ==
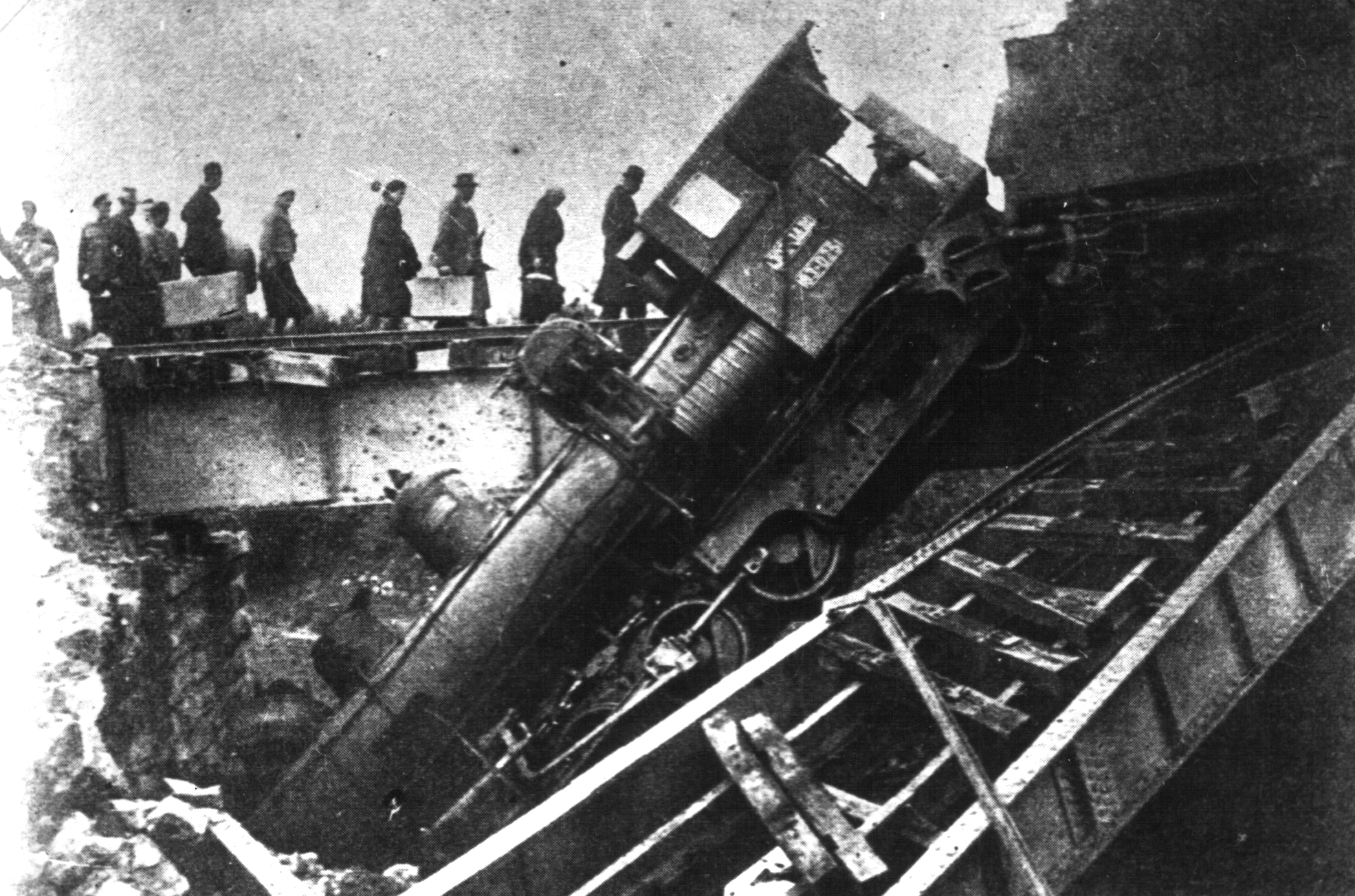
A German train destroyed by Yugoslav Partisans in the Uprising in Serbia (1941)

The Axis Powers occupied Yugoslavia in 1941 and created several puppet states and client states including the Independent State of Croatia, Nedić's Serbia, and the Kingdom of Montenegro. Other parts of Yugoslavia were occupied directly. Yugoslavs opposing the Nazis soon started to organize resistance movements, the Partisans, led by Josip Broz Tito and the Communist Party of Yugoslavia, and the monarchist Chetniks, led by Draža Mihailović. The Sisak People's Liberation Partisan Detachment of the Yugoslav Partisans established in Sisak, Croatia, was the first Partisan armed anti-Fascist movement to take place in occupied Yugoslavia and primarily consisted of Croats. By the end of 1941, of the roughly 7,000 members of Partisans in Croatia, 5,400 were Serbs. By May 1944, the ethnic composition of the Yugoslav Partisans on a national level was made up of 44% Serbs, 30% Croats, and 10% Slovenes. The two resistance movements had conflicting goals, and the Chetniks began collaborating in the middle of the war with the Axis powers to fight against the Partisans. The Chetniks also engaged in a campaign of ethnic cleansing of non-Serbs in the territory of the former Kingdom of Yugoslavia during the war. This was in accordance with Mihailović's directive of 20 December 1941 which called for the cleansing of Croats and Bosniaks living in areas intended to be part of Greater Serbia. Communist Anti-Fascist Council of National Liberation of Yugoslavia was convened on in Bihać in 1942 and in Jajce. Near the end of the war, Western governments attempted to reconcile the various sides, which led to the Tito-Šubašić Agreement in June 1944. However, the Communist Party ruled the post-war state. After heavy bloodshed in a complex war, Yugoslavia was reestablished in 1945, including areas previously ruled by Kingdom of Italy (Istria and parts of Dalmatia). General Mihailović and many other royalists were rounded-up and executed by the Partisans. Mihailović was posthumously awarded the Legion of Merit by President Harry S. Truman for his resistance efforts throughout the war and for his role in Operation Halyard.

=== Independent State of Croatia ===
The Independent State of Croatia (Nezavisna Država Hrvatska, or NDH) was a Nazi-puppet state that became a member of the Axis on 10 April 1941 and joined the Tripartite Pact on 15 June 1941. The state was nominally a monarchy and a de facto Italian-German quasi-protectorate until the Italian capitulation on 8 September 1943, after which it remained a de facto German quasi-protectorate until the German withdrawal near the end of the war. It had a government controlled by the fascist Ustaše movement who were put in power by Germany. During the war, the Ustaše regime committed genocide against Serbs as well as Jews and Roma in the NDH. They also had their own separate concentration camps, such as the Jasenovac extermination camp. Its military fought alongside Axis troops; mainly on anti-Partisan operations within the NDH. Volunteers from the NDH fought in Wehrmacht formations on the Eastern Front as the 'Croatian Legion' for some time. The Armed Forces of the Independent State of Croatia remained engaged in battle a week after the capitulation of Germany on 8 May 1945 in an attempt to surrender to Allied forces rather than the Yugoslav Partisans.

=== Nedić's Serbia ===
Nedic's Serbia was a puppet regime installed by Nazi Germany. Unlike the puppet state Independent State of Croatia, the regime in the occupied Yugoslavia was never accorded status in international law and did not enjoy formal diplomatic recognition on the part of the Axis powers. The regime enjoyed some support. Serbia became the second country in Europe, following Estonia, to be proclaimed Judenfrei (free of Jews).

=== Kingdom of Montenegro ===
The Kingdom of Montenegro was an occupied territory under military government of Fascist Italy during World War II. Although the Italians had intended to establish a quasi-independent Montenegrin kingdom, these plans were permanently shelved after a popular uprising in July 1941. Following the Italian surrender in September 1943, the territory of Montenegro was occupied by German forces which withdrew in December 1944.

== See also ==
- Lists of World War II topics
- Declarations of war during World War II
- Diplomatic history of World War II
- Military production during World War II
- War crimes in World War II
- World War II casualties

== Sources ==
- Benz, Wolfgang (1999). The Holocaust: A German Historian Examines the Genocide. New York: Columbia University Press. ISBN 978-0-231-11215-4.
- Byfield, Judith A. (2012). "Beyond Impact: Toward a New Historiography of Africa and World War II.". In Zeiler, Thomas W. (ed.). A Companion to World War II. Vol. 2. pp. 652–665.
- Cohen, Philip J. (1996). Serbia's Secret War: Propaganda and the Deceit of History. Texas A&M University Press. ISBN 978-0-89096-760-7.
- Cox, John (2002). The History of Serbia. The Greenwood Histories of the Modern Nations. Westport: Greenwood Publishing Group. ISBN 978-0-313-31290-8.
- Lemkin, Raphael (2008). Axis Rule in Occupied Europe. Clark, New Jersey: The Lawbook Exchange. ISBN 978-1-58477-901-8. Archived from the original on 2023-01-14.
- Manoschek, Walter (1995). "Serbien ist judenfrei": Militarische Besatzungspolitik und Judenvernichtung in Serbien 1941/42 (in German) (2nd ed.). Munich: Oldenbourg Verlag. ISBN 9783486561371.
- Rodogno, Davide (2006). Fascism's European Empire: Italian Occupation During the Second World War. Cambridge: Cambridge University Press. ISBN 978-0-521-84515-1. Archived from the original on 2023-02-15.
- Tasovac, Ivo (1999). American Foreign Policy and Yugoslavia, 1939–1941. College Station, Texas: Texas A&M University Press. ISBN 978-0-89096-897-0.
- Tomasevich, Jozo (1975). War and Revolution in Yugoslavia 1941–1945: The Chetniks, Volume 1. Stanford University Press. ISBN 978-0-8047-0857-9.
- Weitz, Eric D. (2009). A Century of Genocide: Utopias of Race and Nation. Princeton, New Jersey: Princeton University Press. ISBN 978-1-40082-550-9.
