= New Orleans Arts and Crafts Club =

Defunct American non-profit institution

New Orleans Arts & Crafts Club
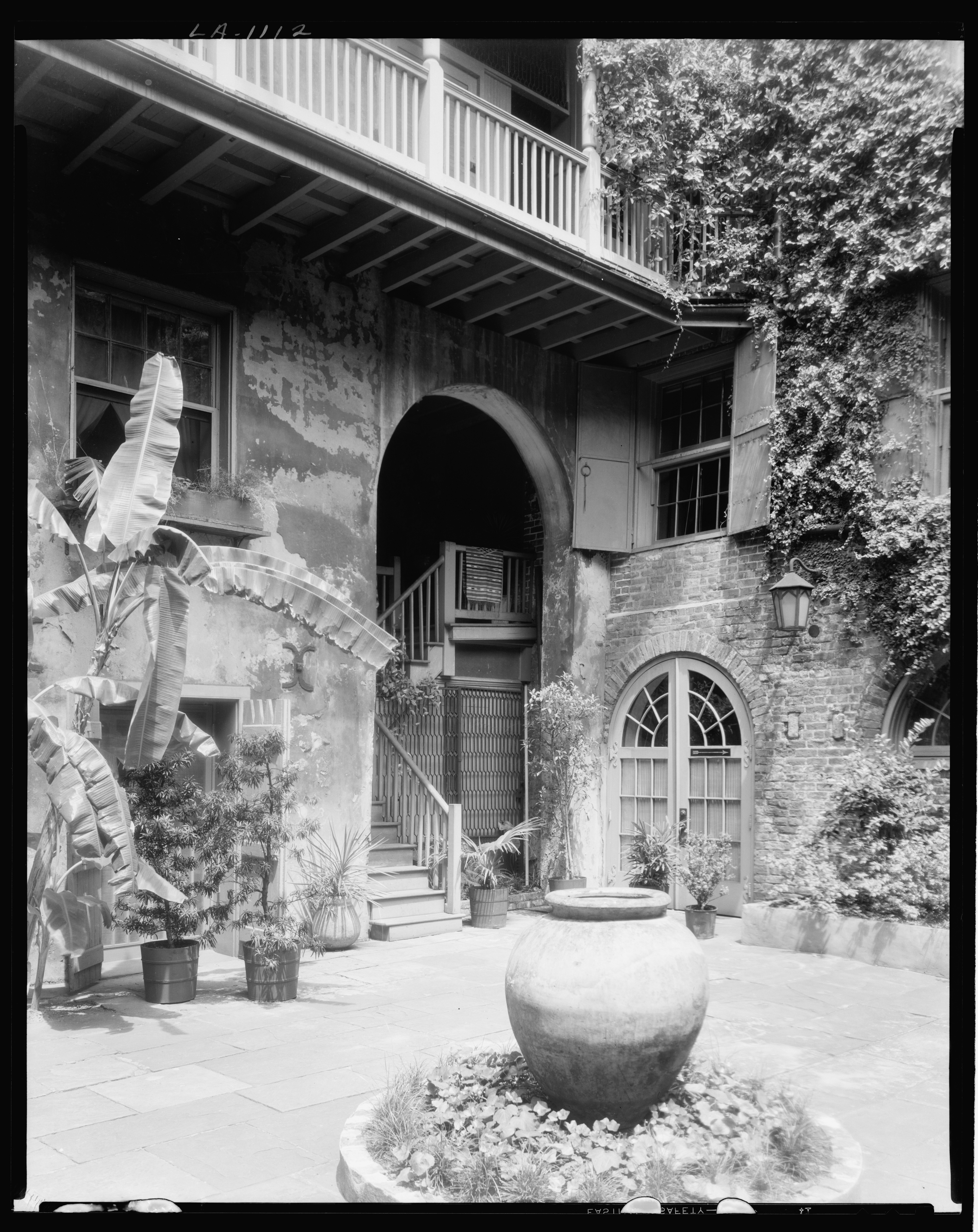
- Courtyard of the New Orleans Arts and Crafts Club as seen in 1937
- Predecessor: Artists Guild
- Established: 1922
- Founder: Martha Gasquet Westfeldt; Alberta Kinsey; Sarah Henderson
- Dissolved: 1951
- Type: Non-profit
- Purpose: Arts and Crafts Movement; Historic preservation
- Location(s): 520 Royal Street; New Orleans, Louisiana, United States
- Members: approx. 500, at peak

The New Orleans Arts and Crafts Club was a non-profit organization headquartered in the French Quarter of New Orleans in the early to mid-20th century. It was dedicated to expanding the global arts and crafts design movement into New Orleans, emphasizing the visual arts. The organization also promoted the preservation of the architectural heritage of the city at a time when many of the historically significant buildings of the French Quarter were being demolished.

== Founding ==
By the early 20th century, the New Orleans French Quarter was experiencing significant neglect. Having once been the center of an important port city, the district was turning into a slum, with historically significant buildings being subdivided into tenements.

Around the same time, business interests were clearing neglected buildings of historic significance in favor of more modern structures. New Orleans writer and journalist Lyle Saxon publicized what he believed was an undesirable trend in the French Quarter and advocated for historic preservation. Influenced by Saxon's description of the trend, in 1919 New Orleans artist Alberta Kinsey formed the Artists Guild, which was the forerunner of the New Orleans Arts & Crafts Club. The organization initially was located at the Jackson House and subsequently relocated to the Old Mortgage Building, both in the New Orleans French Quarter.

In 1921 the Artists Guild reorganized as the Arts & Crafts Club of New Orleans, with Martha Gasquet Westfeldt as a charter member, officer and patron. The club moved to the Green Shutter Tearoom located at 631–633 Royal Street in the New Orleans French Quarter. It became legally chartered in June 1922 with artist Charles Bein as the first director.

The charter of the New Orleans Arts & Crafts Club stated its purpose as:

"to foster higher artistic standards; to establish and maintain classes in the different branches of the arts and crafts and to give instruction therein; to enable artists, craftsmen and the public to get in touch with each other and provide facilities for same; to maintain a permanent club, and an exhibition room for display of the products of arts and crafts; to keep its members in touch with current literature and teachings on the arts and crafts; to aid and assist generally in the promotion and development of arts and crafts."

Early in its history, the New Orleans Arts & Crafts Club moved to the Brulatour Mansion at 520 Royal Street, where it remained for the majority of its existence.

== Activities ==
Soon after the club was established, notable local artists became involved. Examples of such artists include: Genevieve Pitot, Angela Gregory, and Clarence John Laughlin, among others. The club established a close relationship with the nearby Newcomb College School of Art.

By 1926, the club was receiving the majority of its financial support from New Orleans arts patron Sarah Henderson, a sugar refining heiress. During this time, the club moved once again, to 712 Royal Street, also in the New Orleans French Quarter. Henderson's financial support continued until her death in 1950.

The New Orleans Arts & Crafts Club hosted an annual social event called the "Bal des Artistes", fashioned after the Beaux-Arts Ball in Paris, France. The event appealed to well-to-do local socialites and served a fund-raising function for the local arts and for the club itself. Approximately 500 people generally attended the event which had as its slogan "Vive l'art. Vive les artistes."

Through its years of operation, the club received frequent and generally favorable press reports from the local newspapers. The club was able to focus much attention on the artist colony of the New Orleans French Quarter and foster the modern art movement in New Orleans that was important globally at the time.

=== New Orleans School of Art ===
Early in its history, the New Orleans Arts & Crafts Club established the New Orleans School of Art for local artists. Its courses included painting, sculpture, ceramics and architecture. Its courses extended to nontraditional art, consistent with the global arts movement of the time. The school maintained close ties with the nearby Newcomb College School of Art. The instruction in architecture used methods developed at the École Nationale des Beaux-Arts in Paris, France, which extended methods of classical art into architecture. In its years of operation, it was the only arts school in the American South that was not a part of a college or university.

Instructors at the school included various notable artists such as Paul Ninas, Caroline Durieux, Knute Heldner and Enrique Alférez, among others. The nearby Newcomb College School of Art had faculty members who also served in various roles at the New Orleans School of Art.

=== Members ===
At its peak, the New Orleans Arts & Crafts Club had approximately 500 members. Notable members included architectural preservationist Richard Koch.

Artist Josephine Crawford attended the New Orleans School of Art in the 1920s. Later in her career, Crawford had an exhibit at the New Orleans Arts & Crafts Club. Artist and designer John Clemmer served as executive secretary of the New Orleans Arts and Crafts Club and also as director of the art school affiliated with the club. Clemmer was a faculty member of the Newcomb Art Department and the Tulane University School of Architecture. In this respect, Clemmer's affiliations fostered close connections between the university and the club.

Artist and historian A. Boyd Cruise also served as instructor at the New Orleans School of Art and at the Newcomb College Art Department. Cruise subsequently became director of The Historic New Orleans Collection.

== Exhibitions and visiting artists ==
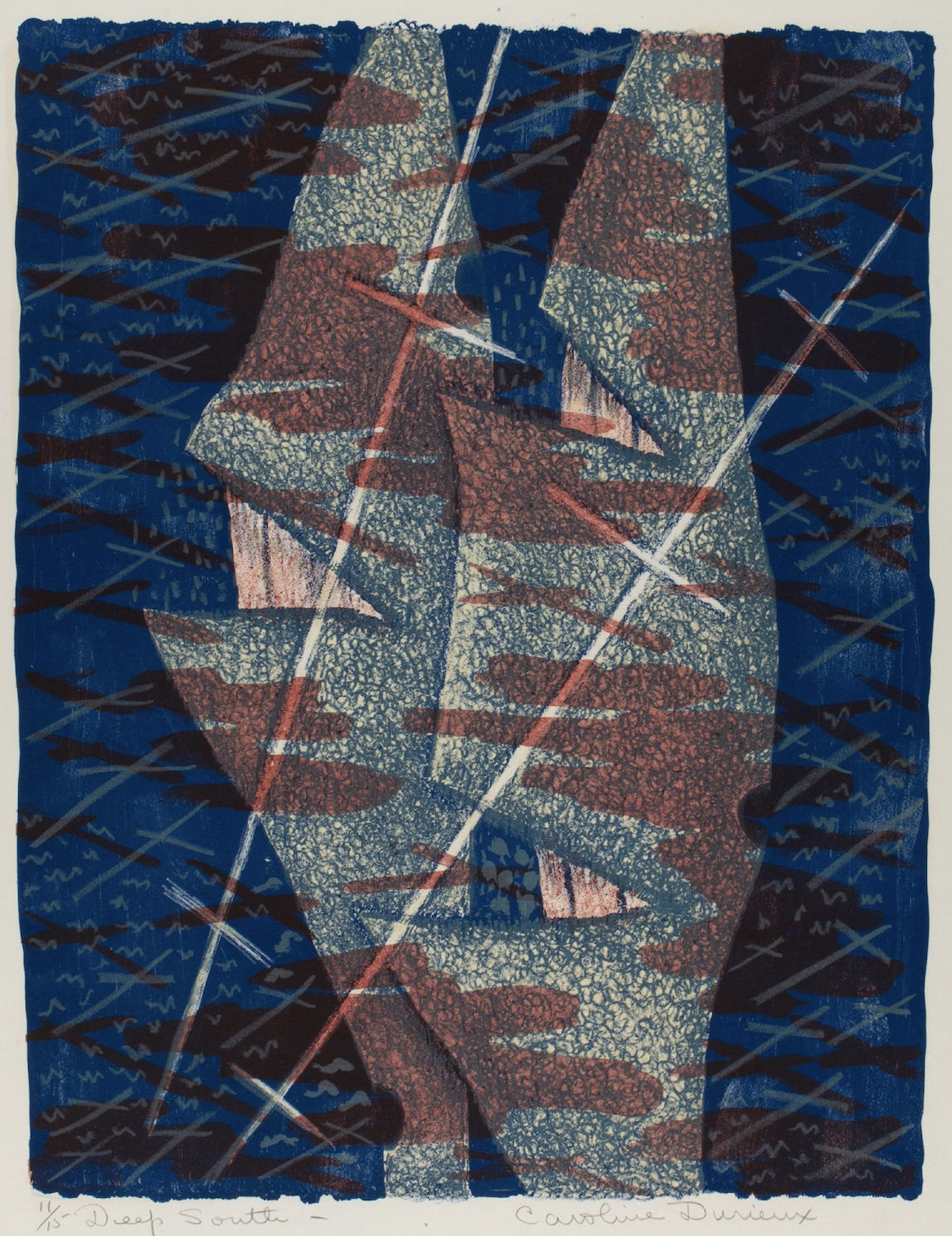
Deep South by Caroline Durieux, a former student of the New Orleans School of Art and active member of the New Orleans Arts & Crafts Club

The New Orleans Arts & Crafts Club sponsored traveling exhibits of notable artists. Examples included a 1931 exhibit of the works of Abraham Rattner. In 1936, the club exhibited works of Edward Hopper and Maurice Prendergast. Traveling exhibitions of Paul Cézanne, Pablo Picasso, Joan Miró, and others came to the club.

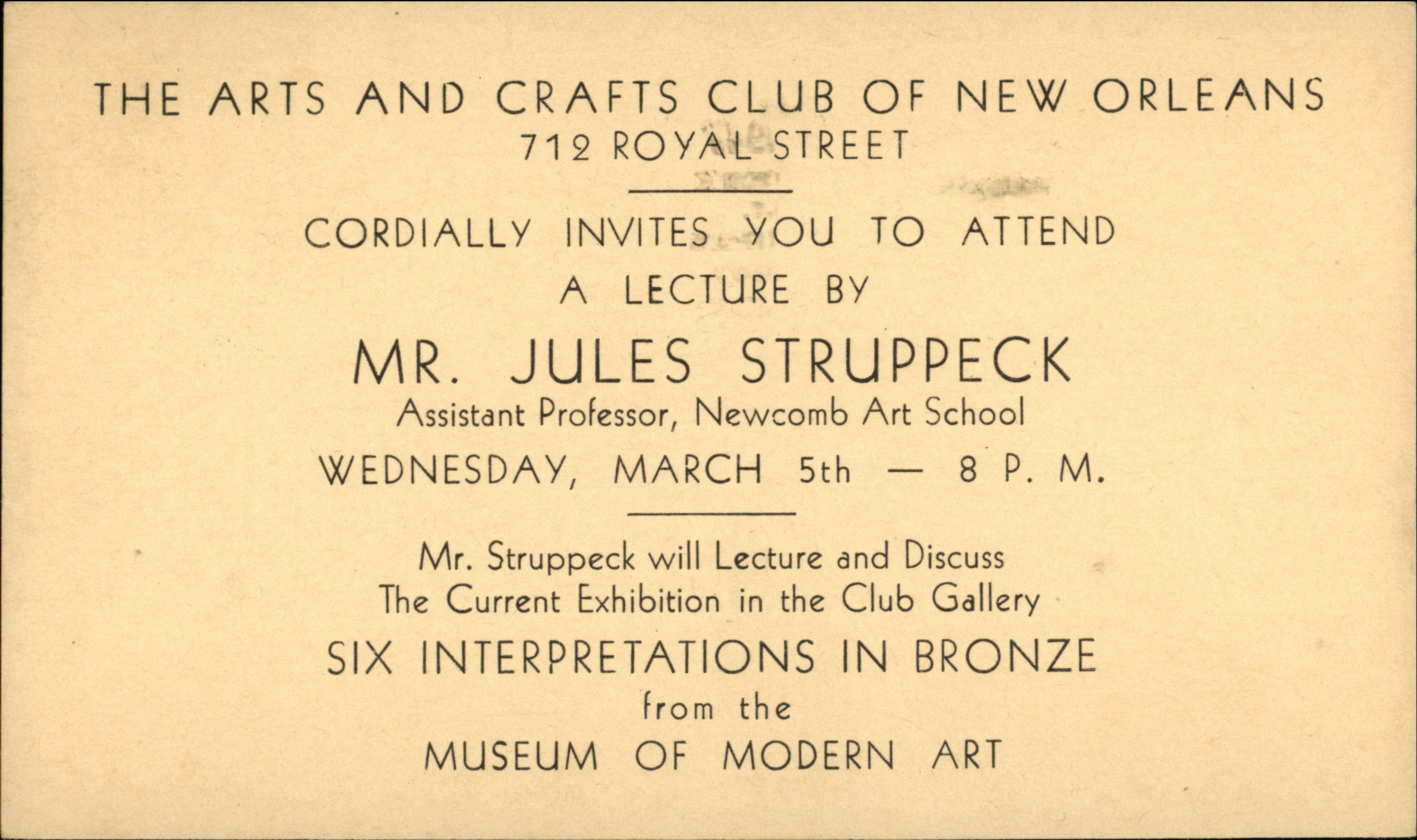
1947 Invitation from the New Orleans Arts & Crafts Club for a Presentation by Sculptor Jules Struppeck

Modern artist Caroline Durieux was director of the New Orleans division of the Federal Art Project. Through her efforts, much art from the Federal Art Project was displayed at the New Orleans Arts & Crafts Club.

The New Orleans Arts & Crafts Club also sponsored traveling exhibits in which the works of artists affiliated with the club were exhibited elsewhere in the United States and Central America. However, few of the club's artists achieved recognition at the time, with the exception of Caroline Durieux.

Gertrude Stein lectured at the New Orleans Arts and Crafts Club in 1935.

== Decline ==
Financial difficulties of the New Orleans Arts & Crafts Club began during the Great Depression. The generosity of patrons maintained the club. Such support diminished significantly after the death in 1950 of arts patron Sarah Henderson, (Note: One source states that Henderson died in 1944.) ultimately resulting in the club's final closure on March 24, 1951.

== Legacy ==
New Orleans French Quarter artists prospered during the 1920s, and artist-scholar John Shelton Reed referred to the French Quarter of that time period as the "Dixie Bohemia". Starting in the 1920s through the duration of the existence of the New Orleans Arts and Crafts Club, the club provided a means for French Quarter artists to connect with well-to-do arts patrons who lived in other parts of the city, especially Uptown New Orleans. In this way, the club aided the arts movement in New Orleans including the rise of modernist trends.

The New Orleans Arts and Crafts Club made significant progress in advancing the global modernist movement regionally which previously had a strong emphasis on Southern art.

Much of the written materials generated by the New Orleans Arts and Crafts Club were archived at The Historic New Orleans Collection and also at the Delgado Museum of Art.

Artist John McCrady was a student at the New Orleans School of Art. He later went on to found the New Southern Art Group which advanced much of the same cause as the New Orleans Arts & Crafts Club.
