= Josephine Crawford =

American painter

Josephine Marien Crawford (December 31, 1878 – March 24, 1952) was an American painter, born into an old, aristocratic family in New Orleans, Louisiana. Along with Paul Ninas and Will Henry Stevens, she has been credited with introducing modernism to New Orleans.

== Life and career ==
Crawford was the sixth of nine children of Charles Campbell Crawford and Louise Bienvenu Crawford, and grew up speaking English and French; through her mother she was descended from the Bienvenus, who had settled in Louisiana in the eighteenth century. Her maternal grandfather had purchased the family's townhouse, at 612 Royal Street in the French Quarter in 1839. Her father's family was from Belfast. In her youth she wrote poetry, much of it about the house and its surroundings; she spent time in North Carolina and in Biloxi, Mississippi as well, which further informed her sensibilities. She would return to Biloxi throughout her life. These childhood trips inspired her earliest known drawings, which date to 1896, though she is known to have carried a sketchbook as early as 1888. She traveled widely throughout her life, and is known to have visited much of Europe, Central America, and Mexico at various times.

Crawford studied at the Cenas Institute for Young Ladies and McDonogh High School No. 3, and was briefly enrolled, in 1895, at Newcomb College. She evinced no special talent in drawing or painting in early life, and her formal study of art did not begin until later in life, when she enrolled in classes at the school of the Arts and Crafts Club of New Orleans in the 1920s. Friends of her later years claimed that she had had no formal education at all.

Crawford spent the winter of 1927–28 in Paris, studying with André Lhote; in the spring she continued her studies, traveling to Vienna and working at the Kunstgewerbeschule. In Europe she entered the Cubist scene in Paris and became friends with and was mentored by Pablo Picasso, Georges Braque, Raoul Dufy, and others. She then returned home to New Orleans and continued to paint and exhibit, with her first solo show coming in 1928. The following year saw her exhibiting in New York, at the Montross Gallery, where she and Charles Bain were singled out for praise from a local critic; she continued showing her art regionally and in New York and Philadelphia for the next decade. She won much critical acclaim and a number of local prizes; she also created work for the Public Works of Art Project of the New Deal.

Because her work was far too avant garde for New Orleans at that time, after she returned to Louisiana she did most of her painting in private and much of it was not discovered until after her death. Following their discovery, many of these works were given permanent mountings and presented to the public for the first time.

For much of her life, Crawford lived with her stepsister Louise Crawford in the house on Royal Street, a building in which Lyle Saxon also had an apartment. In the 1940s, however, she was forced to leave after developing cancer; she then moved in with a sister in the Garden District. Crawford died in New Orleans in 1952; her brother later donated a large collection of personal effects, including sketchbooks, personal papers, and poetry as well as many artworks, to The Historic New Orleans Collection. The Delgado Museum, today the New Orleans Museum of Art, held an exhibit of her work, "The World of Josephine Crawford", in 1965. A biography, Josephine Crawford: An Artist’s Vision, was released in 2009.

== Work ==
Crawford's style, rather than being grounded in realism, bordered on the abstract, in contrast to the Impressionism-derived style which was prominent in New Orleans for much of her early life. Characteristically her palette is muted, lending a quiet quality to her work. Her Cubist-inspired style, developed after her French sojourn, later gave way to a more fluid and expressive technique, which came to full flower in the watercolors and gouaches she produced in the 1930s. Her style continued to mature, becoming ever more minimalist by the end of her career.

Crawford's most unusual work was a series of eight large portraits of family members, created from photographs and painted on the wallpaper of the parlor at her house, which she used as her studio; these pieces, in which a few inches of the patterned wallpaper are allowed to serve as a pictorial border, are reminiscent of the work of Henri Matisse and Amedeo Modigliani. They were among the pieces donated by her brother after her death; they were carefully removed from the walls after the house sustained damage in Hurricane Betsy, and later remounted for exhibition.

Critic George Jordan has described Crawford as "one of the most experimental painters of the New South between 1900 and 1950."

Her works can be found in:

- Morris Museum of Art, Augusta, Georgia
- Historic New Orleans Collection
