= Richard Koch (architect) =

American architectural preservationist and photographer

- Born: June 9, 1889; New Orleans, Louisiana, U.S.
- Died: September 20, 1971 (aged 82); Covington, Louisiana, U.S.
- Education: Tulane University
- Occupation: Architect
- Practice: Koch & Wilson
- Projects: Vieux Carré Commission; Historic American Buildings Survey

Richard Koch (1889 – 1971) (pronounced Coke) was an architect who specialized in architectural conservation and the restoration of historically significant buildings. He emphasized buildings in New Orleans, Louisiana. Koch worked with the Historic American Buildings Survey (HABS) during the Great Depression. He was an early leader of the Vieux Carré Commission.

Koch was also an architectural photographer with many of his works archived by the Library of Congress. His photography highlighted the antebellum period in Louisiana. He was a founding partner of Koch & Wilson, a firm that specializes in architectural preservation.

== Early life and education ==
Koch was born on June 9, 1889, to parents Julius Koch and Anna Koch (née Frotscher) in New Orleans, Louisiana. His father was an architect and a builder in New Orleans and had immigrated to the city from Stuttgart, Germany. He enrolled at Tulane University, graduating in 1910, being the first graduate of the Tulane School of Architecture. He subsequently studied for a year (Note: Some sources say that Koch attended Atelier Bernier for two years.) at the Atelier Bernier in Paris, France.

Following matriculation, Koch was a first lieutenant in the United States Army Signal Corps during World War I.

== Career ==
=== Early professional career ===
On completion of his military service, Koch worked as an architectural apprentice for a brief time in the northeastern United States before returning to New Orleans. He then joined the architectural firm of Charles Armstrong, eventually becoming a partner in the firm. Through Koch's influence, the firm of Armstrong & Koch focused on restorations and designs of traditional Louisiana buildings and structure. The firm was dissolved in 1934.

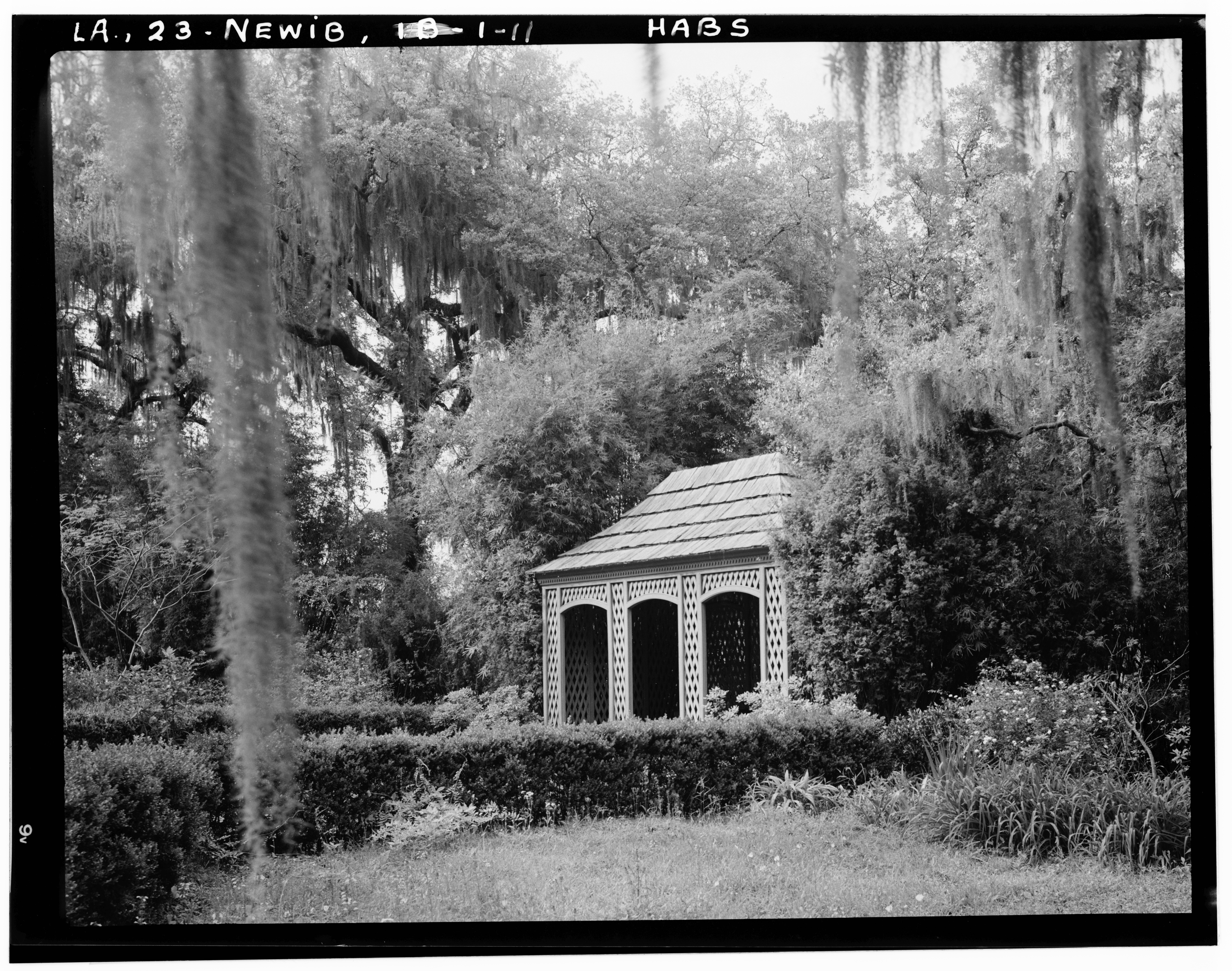
Garden House at Shadows-on-the-Teche. The Garden House was designed by Koch and later photographed by Koch.

In 1922, preservationist William Weeks Hall commissioned Koch to restore Hall's plantation home, which was known as Shadows-on-the-Teche. Within a year, Koch completed the project and the plantation home became part of the National Trust for Historic Preservation. Years later, Koch photographed this plantation as part of his efforts with the Historic American Buildings Survey.

Koch traveled in Spain in the early 1920s, an experience that enhanced is interest and skills in architectural photography. His photographic subjects in Spain included the Generalife in Granada and the Alcázar of Seville. During this time, Koch also made architectural drawings of historically significant structures in Spain.

=== Architectural photography ===
Early in the 1930s, Koch became director of the Louisiana division of the Historic American Buildings Survey, which was part of the United States Department of Interior. At that time, Koch began his photographic documentation of historic buildings in Louisiana. This task also included employing teams of draftsmen who developed architectural drawings of historic buildings.

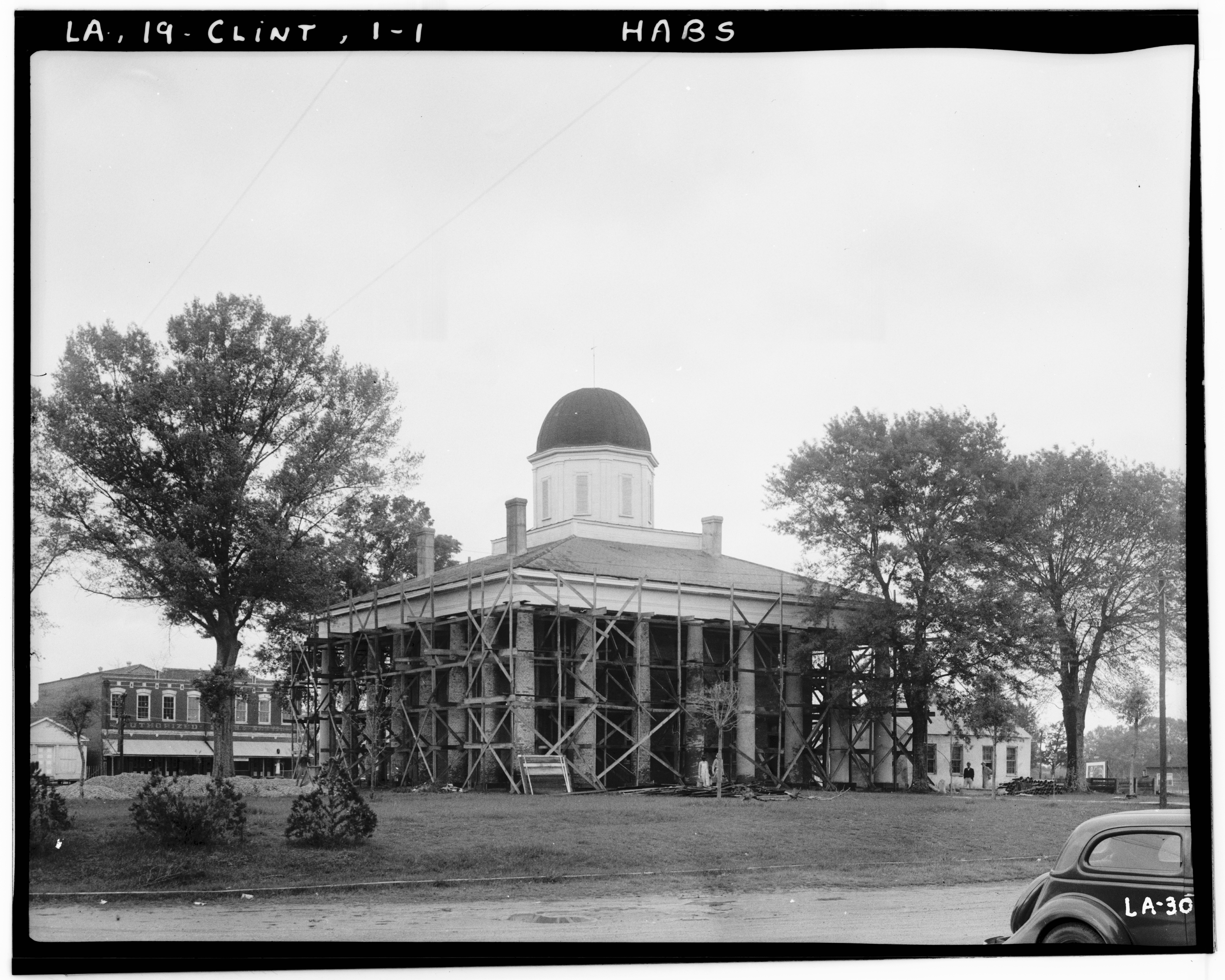
Clinton Courthouse photographed by Koch while the structure was under renovation

Koch typically used a view camera with 4 inch x 5 inch film for his architectural photography. Many of the photographs were sent to HABS offices in Washington, DC, although Koch often retained duplicates in his own collection. Many of his works were later recombined into a single collection late in Koch's life.

Among the notable plantations that Koch photographed during this period of his career are the Uncle Sam Plantation, the Butler Greenwood Plantation, the Belle Grove Plantation, the Homewood Plantation, and others.

At the peak of Koch's tenure as regional director of HABS, he had a team of 19 architects and photographers as subordinates. They photographically documented approximately 150 structures in and around Louisiana, sorting the documents into categories according to the age, state of decay, rareness, and building type of the subjects. During his time with HABS, most of his photographs went to the Library of Congress.

While Louisiana director of HABS, Koch hired artist A. Boyd Cruise who later became the first director of The Historic New Orleans Collection. He commissioned architectural photographer Robert W. Tebbs to join the HABS effort in Louisiana. Koch was also a colleague of Frances Benjamin Johnston during her efforts as an architectural photographer in Louisiana.

Koch's efforts on photographic documentation of historic buildings continued until 1965, long after his term with HABS had ended. Koch's photographic style was to depict the buildings as they appeared, regardless if they were in disrepair. He often avoided harsh sunlight on the subjects, and often included people or automobiles in the photographs in order to provide size perspective.

=== Architectural projects ===
In 1955, Koch partnered with Samuel Wilson Jr., to form the architectural firm Koch and Wilson. Wilson was previously employed by Koch as a draftsman. The firm specialized in architectural restoration and preservation. The firm remains in operation as of 2023.

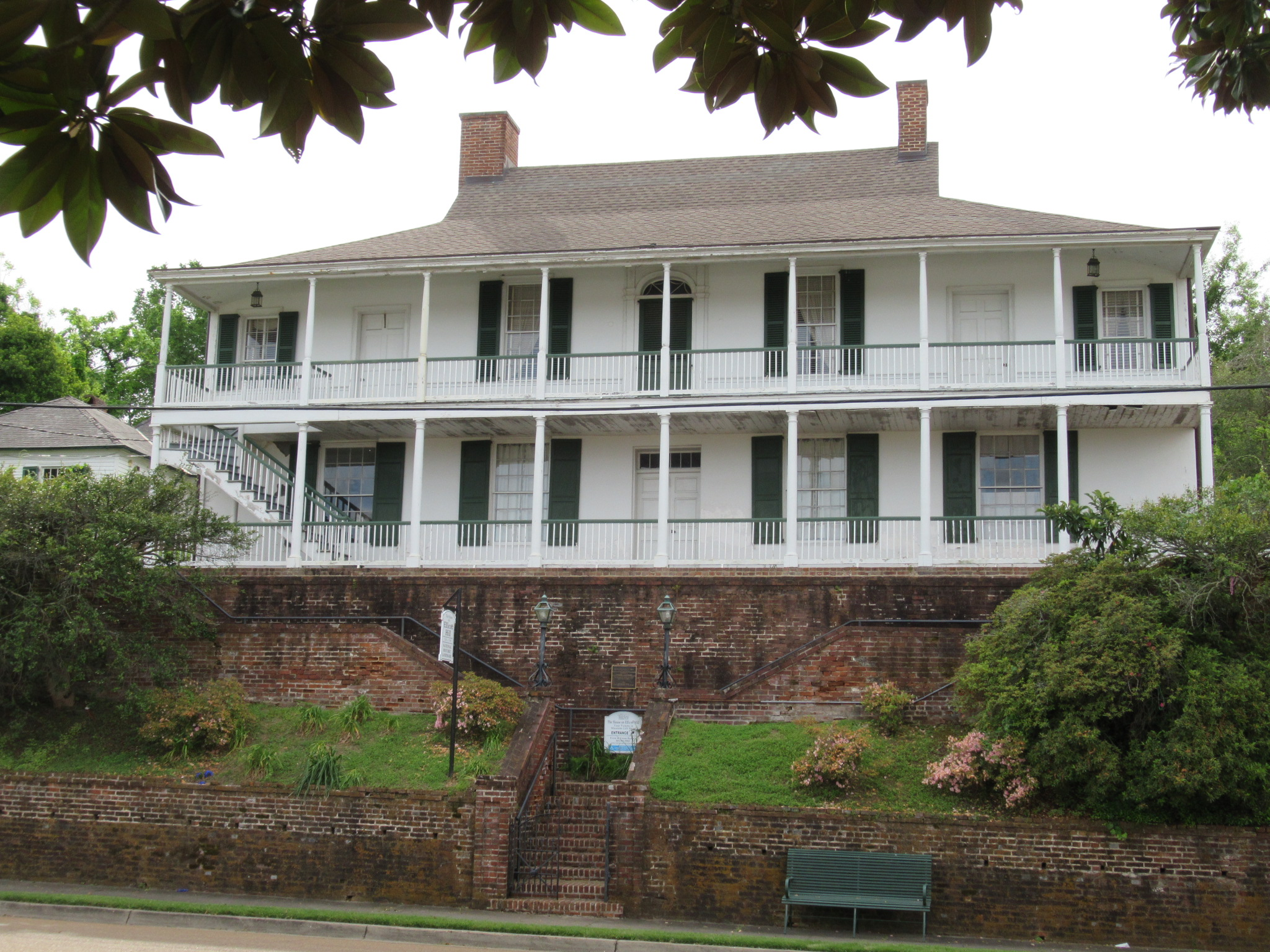
The House on Ellicott's Hill, a home in Natchez that Koch restored

Koch conducted architectural restoration projects in Natchez, Mississippi, the New Orleans French Quarter, the New Orleans Garden District, St. Francisville, Louisiana, and elsewhere in Louisiana.

As a member of the Koch & Wilson firm, Koch designed the restoration and preservation project at the Evergreen Plantation home in Wallace, Louisiana, during the period 1944 to 1948. Koch's restoration projects in New Orleans as a member of the firm included The Cabildo, the Merieult House, and Gallier Hall.

Koch led the architectural preservation of Oakley Plantation House (now part of the Audubon State Historic Site) in St. Francisville, Louisiana. The project was carried out from 1950 to 1953 under Koch's direction, using penal labor from the Louisiana State Penitentiary for the actual workmanship.

Koch redesigned Le Petit Theatre du Vieux Carre in a style consistent with historic character of the neighborhood. With landscape architect William Weidorn and sculptor Enrique Álvarez, Koch designed the New Orleans Botanical Garden. In 1941 Koch also collaborated with Weidorn on a restoration of the St. Anthony's Garden in the French Quarter of New Orleans.

Koch and Wilson restored the New Orleans home of philanthropist Matilda Geddings Gray in 1969, a home that Koch had himself once previously restored in 1937. The home is sometimes known as the Gauche-Stream House.

=== Vieux Carré Commission ===
The New Orleans French Quarter is sometimes known by the term Vieux Carré, from the French language. By the early 20th century, much of the historic heritage of the area was being lost as buildings in the French Quarter were being demolished to make room for more modern structures. In 1920, interested civic leaders and other citizens organized for the sake of preservation of the neighborhood. Initially known as the Vieux Carré Restoration Society, Koch became president of the organization in 1930.

Early in Koch's tenure as president of the Vieux Carré Commission, he recognized that the organization had little authority. Koch convinced local officials that the commission needed authority to issue permits for structural changes in the historically significant French Quarter and to levy fines on violators. Because of legal considerations, an amendment to the Louisiana state constitution was required to institute these changes, which ultimately took place in 1936. The Vieux Carré Commission remains a part of New Orleans city government as of 2023.

=== Other service ===
Koch served on the board of directors of the American Institute of Architects. He was a member of the National Architectural Accrediting Board and served as the organization's president in 1954. Koch was on the board of directors for New Orleans City Park and also the Isaac Delgado Museum of Art.

In 1922, Koch was among the founders of the New Orleans Arts and Crafts Club.

== Death ==
Koch died unexpectedly on September 20, 1971, at the home of his two sisters in Covington, Louisiana. He is interred at Metairie Lakelawn Cemetery in New Orleans in a family tomb.

== Awards and legacy ==
In 1938, Koch received the Silver Medal of the Architectural League of New York for his residential designs. As of the time of his death, Koch was a Fellow of the American Institute of Architects.

=== Koch collection ===
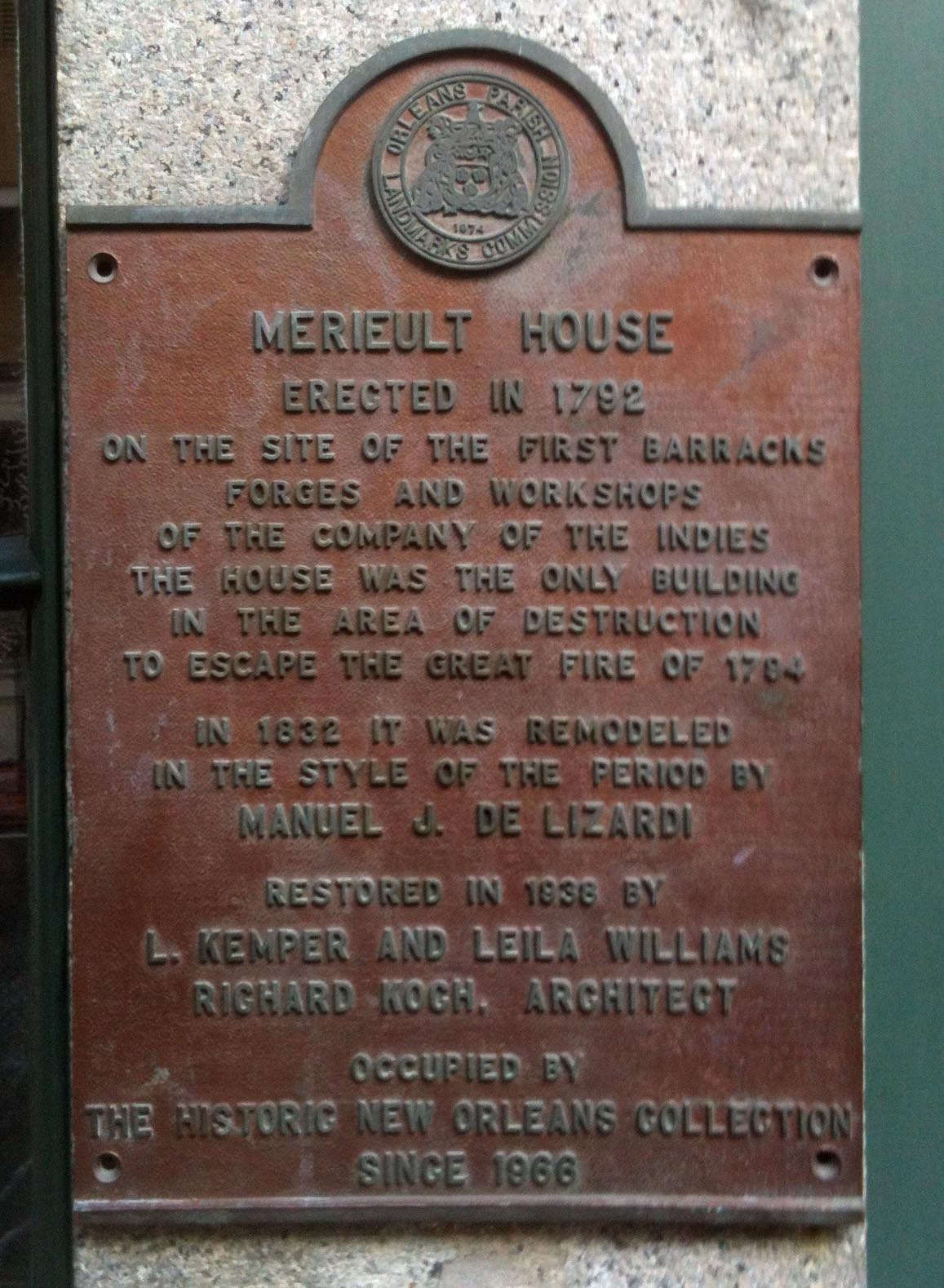
Plaque at the entrance to Merieult House, a building in the New Orleans French Quarter restored by Koch

A large portion of Koch's collection of photographs was bequeathed to Tulane University, being transferred in 1972. The collection resides in the Special Collections Division of the Howard-Tilton Memorial Library and numbers approximately 5000 items from Koch's collection.

The items are mostly photographic images or photographic negatives of historically significant buildings, many of which were subsequently destroyed or in a dilapidated state at the time Koch photographed them. Building types include various structures on plantations, the plantation homes, urban cottages, shops and other commercial buildings, as well as religious structures. Koch strived to show these structures as they were in their state at the time of his photographs.

The collection includes images of buildings constructed from the mid-1700s until the late 1900s, with particular emphasis on the antebellum period of 1825 to 1861. About 90% of the images are of structures in Louisiana, for which about half were images taken in New Orleans. The remainder were in Mississippi.

The collection at Tulane University has been characterized as being "among the most comprehensive visual surveys of historic Mississippi delta architecture now in a public archive".

Also at the time of his death, Koch bequeathed a substantial number of his photographs and art works to The Historic New Orleans Collection. Their collection was expanded in 1985 with a gift of approximately 300 of Koch's works from Solis Seiferth, who was a local architect that also designed public buildings in Louisiana.

== See also ==
- Contributing property for a discussion of the Vieux Carré Commission.
- Buildings and architecture of New Orleans
- List of plantations in Louisiana

== Gallery ==
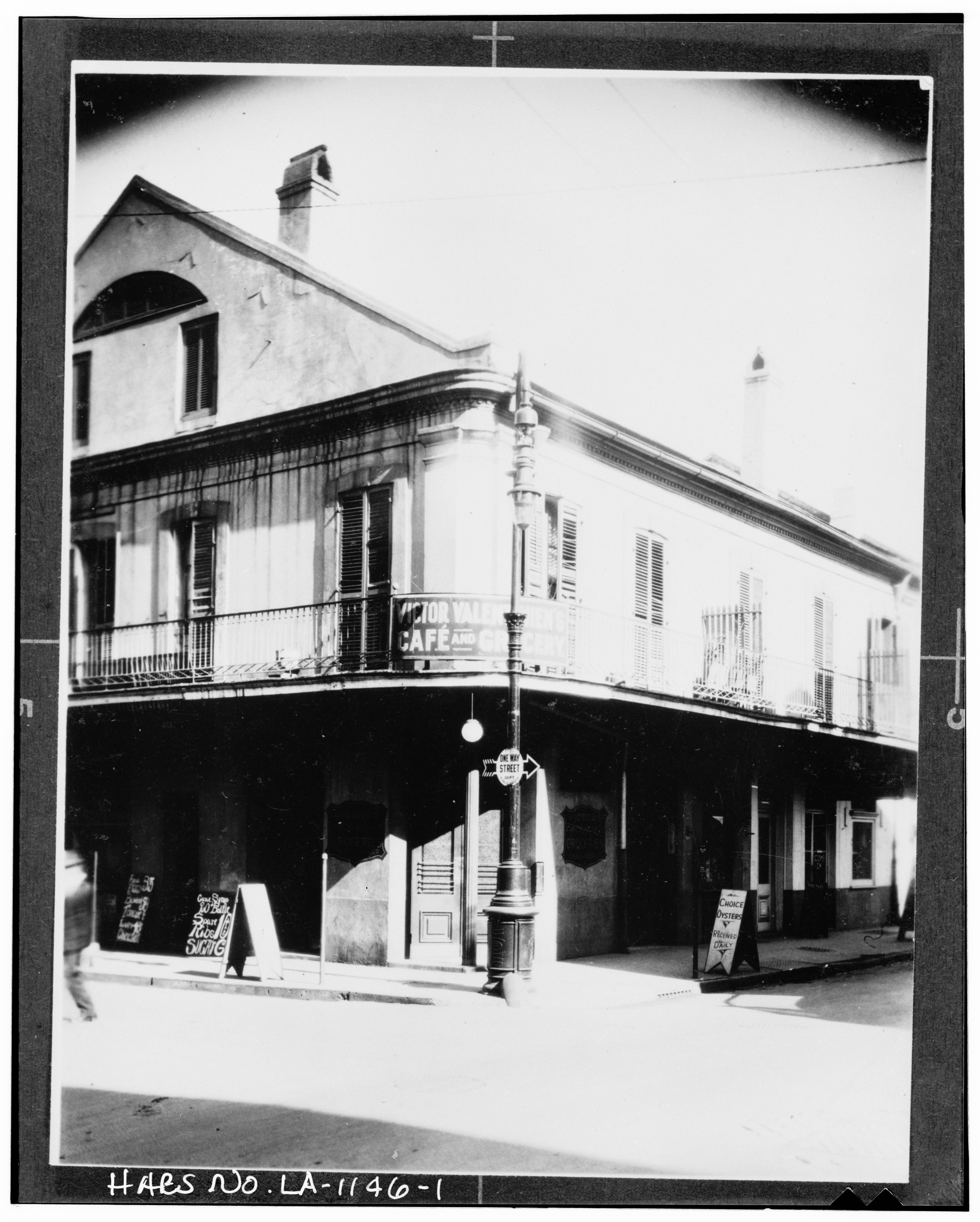
Corner of Chartres Street and Toulouse Street in New Orleans

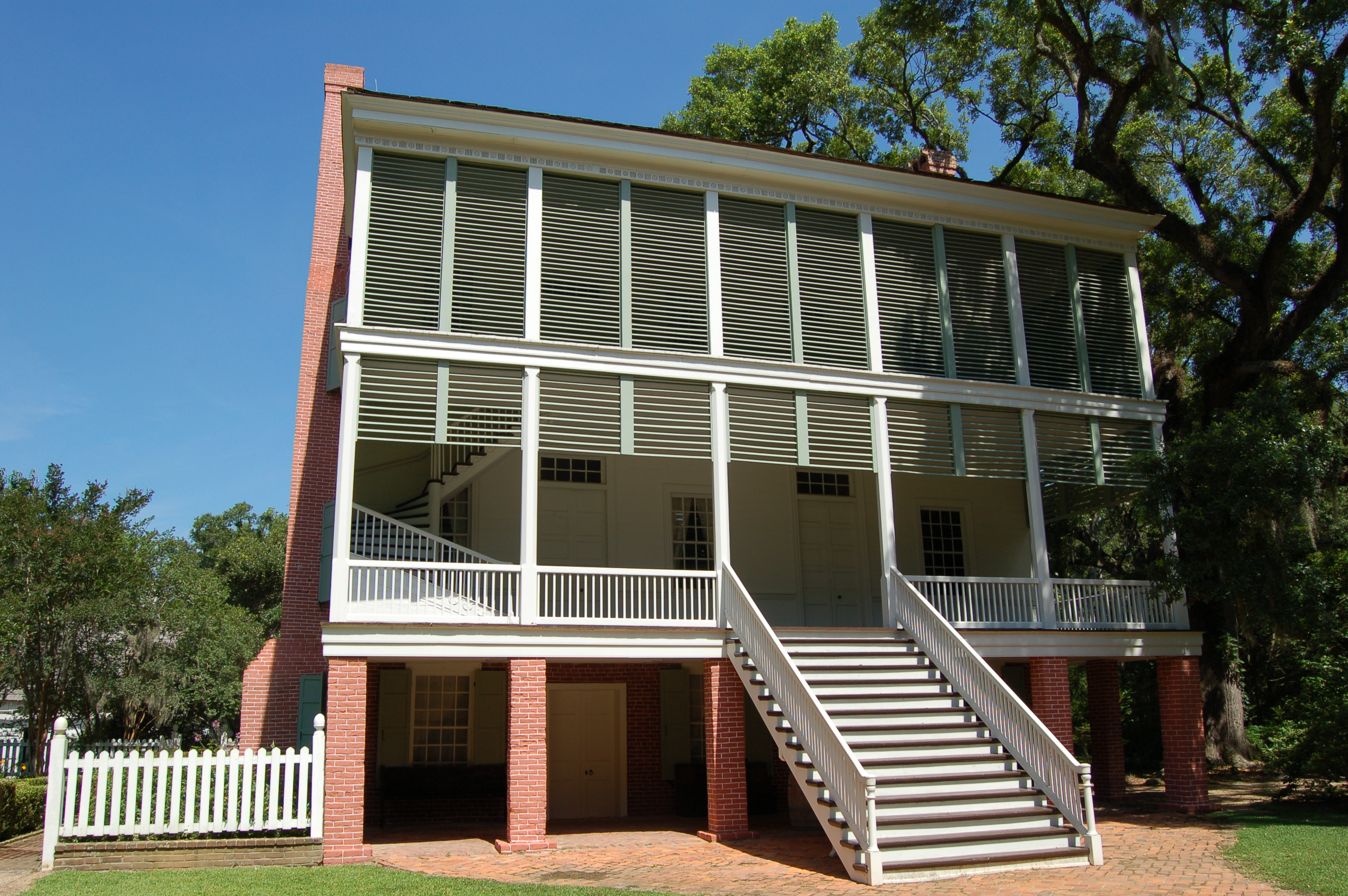
Contemporary view of Oakley Plantation House, for which Koch designed the restoration

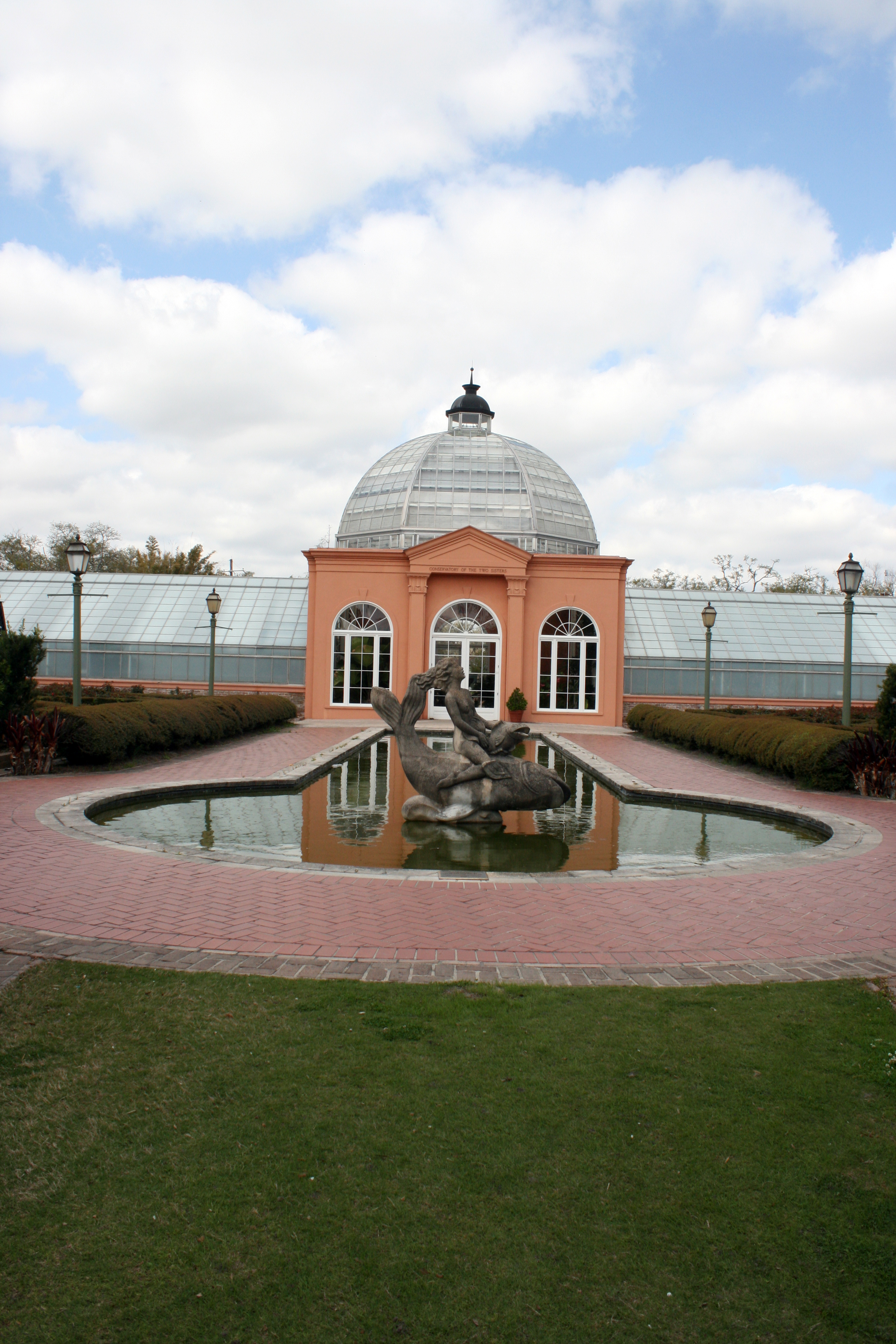
Conservatory at New Orleans Botanical Gardens, a Koch design

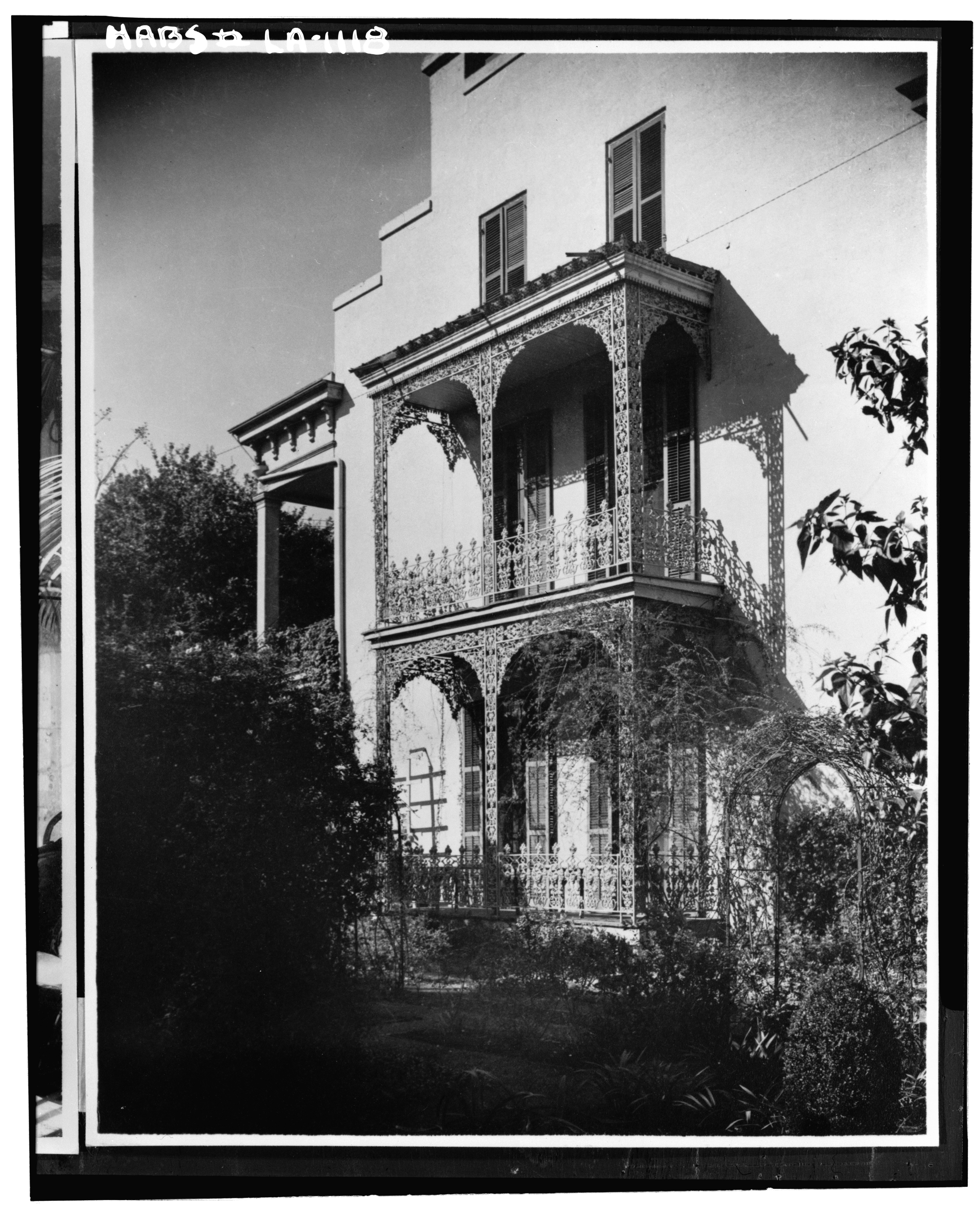
Charles Kock house, New Orleans

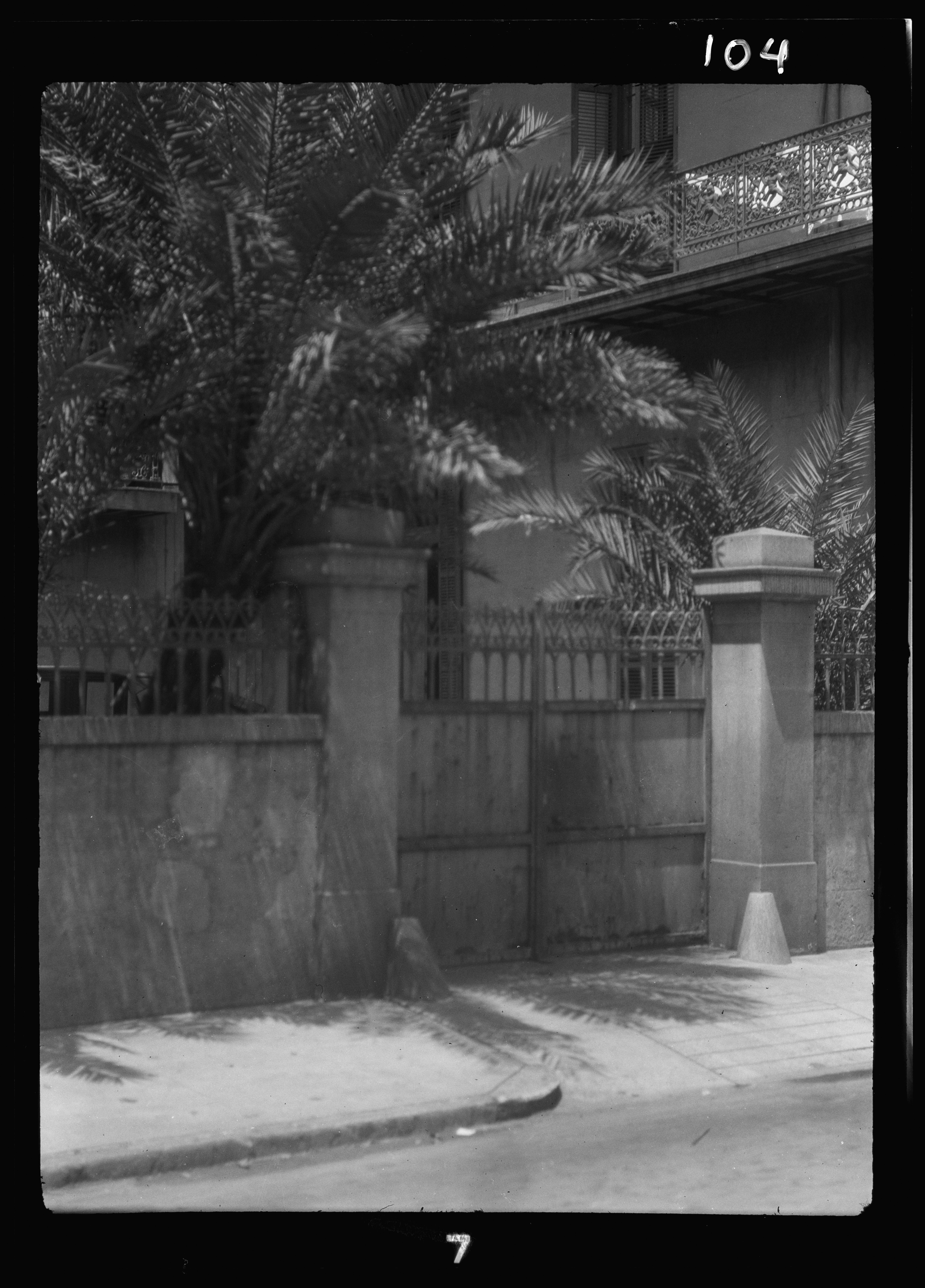
The Gauche House gate. The home restoration in 1938 was designed by Koch

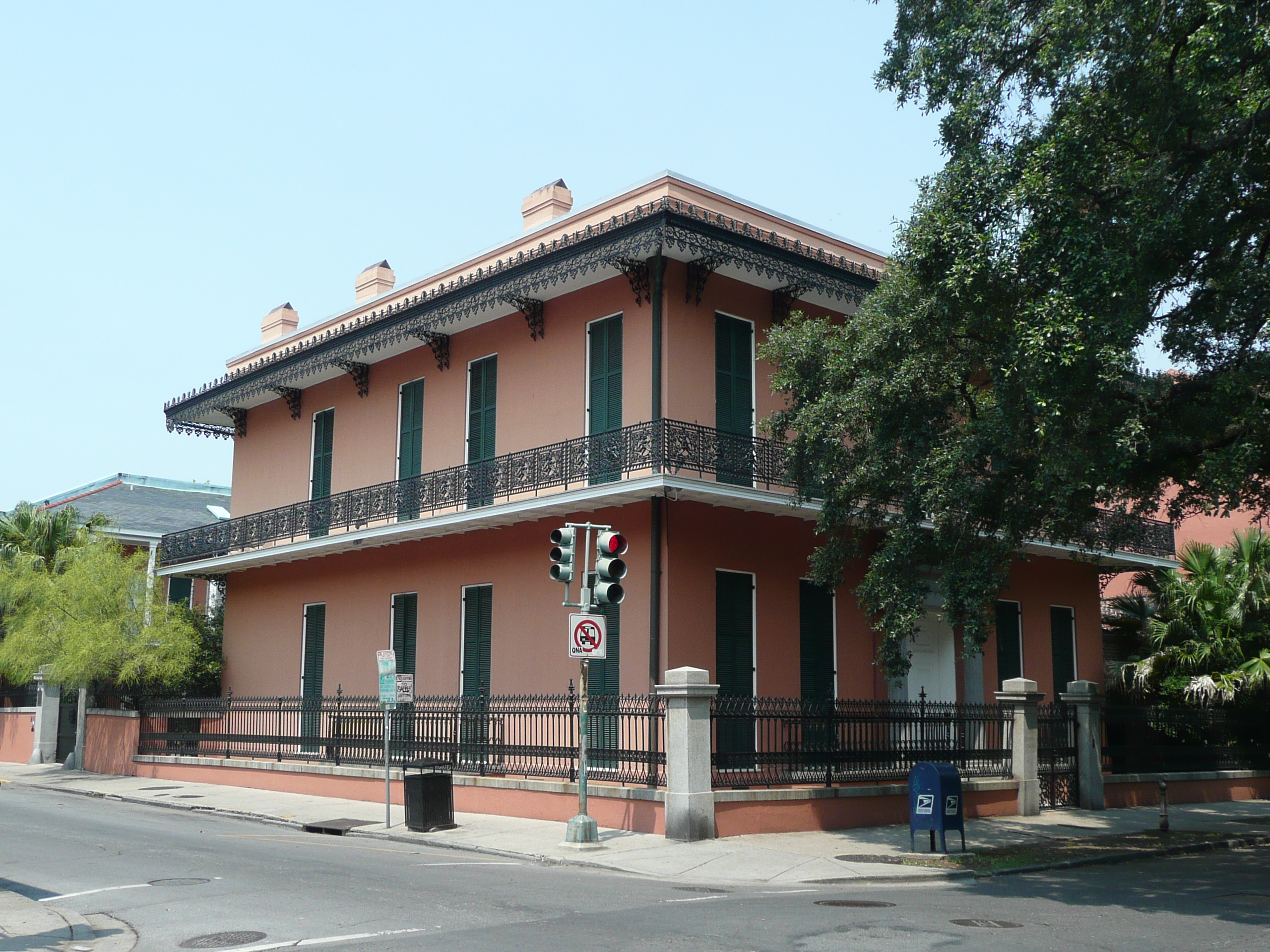
The Gauche-Stream House, a building twice restored by Koch or his firm
