= Jane Ninas =

American artist

Untitled, (Jane Ninas) by Walker Evans

Jane Smith Ninas Evans Sargeant (1913–2005) was an American painter. She was born in Fond du Lac, Wisconsin. She studied art at Newcomb College in New Orleans. She worked for the Federal Art Project in Louisiana, which was part of the New Deal. Her work was included in the 1936 exhibition New Horizons in American Art (as Jane Ninas) at the Museum of Modern Art. She was married several times including marriage to the painter Paul Ninas and the photographer Walker Evans. Evans' created several series of portraits of her, including Untitled, (Jane Ninas) (1935), Five 35mm Film Frames: Jane Ninas (1941), 9 Portraits of Jane Smith Evans (1952), and Jane Smith Evans (1953).

In 1991 The Historic New Orleans Collection held an exhibition Walker Evans and Jane Ninas in New Orleans, 1935-1936 which included her paintings and his photographs.
