= Rolland Golden =

American visual artist (1931–2019)

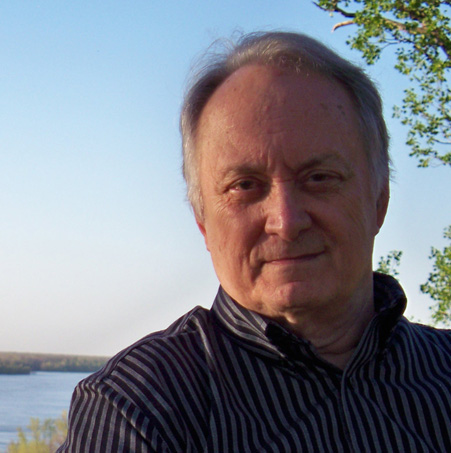
- Golden in 2011
- Born: Rolland Harve Golden; November 8, 1931; New Orleans, Louisiana, U.S.
- Died: July 1, 2019 (aged 87); Folsom, Louisiana, U.S.
- Known for: Painting, Drawing, Lithography
- Movement: Realism (art), Southern art

Rolland Harve Golden (November 8, 1931 – July 1, 2019) was an American visual artist known mainly for his realism, abstract realism and "Borderline-Surrealisterm", a term he used to describe a style of his where the subject is "not entirely impossible, but highly unlikely." He is listed in Marquis Who's Who in America, Marquis Who's Who in American Art and Marquis Who's Who in the World.

Golden studied under regionalist painter and teacher John McCrady in the French Quarter of New Orleans after finishing a four-year stint in the United States Navy during the Korean War, graduating in 1957.

Golden had a solo exhibition tour the former Soviet Union from 1976 to 1977, touring Moscow, Kiev, Leningrad, and Odessa.

== Childhood ==
Golden was born in New Orleans, Louisiana, but at the age of two he and his parents moved to Grenada, Mississippi, then four years later Jackson, Mississippi, where they lived four years before moving to Montgomery, Alabama, for one year and then Birmingham, Alabama, for one year before returning to New Orleans. His father was a manager for AT&T and his position moved his family around. Golden was a very sickly child and spent much of his time in bed – he was not expected to live past his teenage years because he was asthmatic and anemic. He did improve and even went on to play football in High School and for one semester at Southwestern Louisiana Institute in Lafayette, Louisiana – now the University of Louisiana at Lafayette. Golden said that his love for the Mississippi Delta was formed in his childhood, while living in these rural areas, notably Grenada, Mississippi. "I didn't realize it at the time," Rolland told Southwest Art magazine in 1978, "but the beauty of the rural South was making quite an impact on my young mind."

== Early adulthood ==
Golden left college after only one semester to join the United States Navy, before being drafted, to fight the Korean War. He spent four years, mainly on aircraft carriers, in teletype positions. After being stationed on Guam for 20 months, he served on the USS Yorktown, USS Wasp, USS Oriskany, and USS Lexington. Upon discharge, he enrolled in the John McCrady Art School in the French Quarter of New Orleans and studied under the well-known southern artist, John McCrady. Golden studied for two years and graduated in 1957.June 1957, he opened his first studio/gallery at 624 Royal Street in the French Quarter. The studio was called Patio Art Studio and was located through a carriageway and patio and in the back, slave quarter section of the building. Golden would remain in this location for 10 years. Golden married Stella Anne Doussan August, 1957. They mainly lived in the French Quarter between 1957 and 1981 while raising three children: Carrie (1958), Mark Damian (1961) and Lucille (1963).

== Museum exhibitions ==
"An Alternate Vision"; , Ogden Museum of Southern Art, New Orleans, LA 8/14; "Blend the lonesome romantic realism of Andrew Wyeth with the metaphysical magic of Rene Magritte and you find yourself in the world of New Orleans native Rolland Golden", wrote renowned New Orleans art critic Doug MacCash, in his review of this exhibition

"River & Reverie: Paintings of the Mississippi";, Mississippi Museum of Art, Jackson, Mississippi September 2010 - January 2011;Alexandria Museum of Art, Alexandria, Louisiana 2011; Masur Museum of Art, Monroe, Louisiana, 2011; Louisiana Old State Capitol, Baton Rouge, Louisiana December 7, 2011 - March 10, 2012;Walter Anderson Museum of Art, Ocean Springs, Mississippi, 2012;The University of Mississippi Museum of Art, Oxford, Mississippi, 2012

Rolland in front of his Katrina triptych painting, "Hell & High Water", 2008

"Katrina: Days of Terror, Months of Anguish" - November 2007-February 2008 at the New Orleans Museum of Art and February–March 2009 at the Museum of Art, Springfield, MO.

== Awards ==
Louisiana Legends 2015 Award Honoree - Awarded by the Louisiana Public Broadcasting

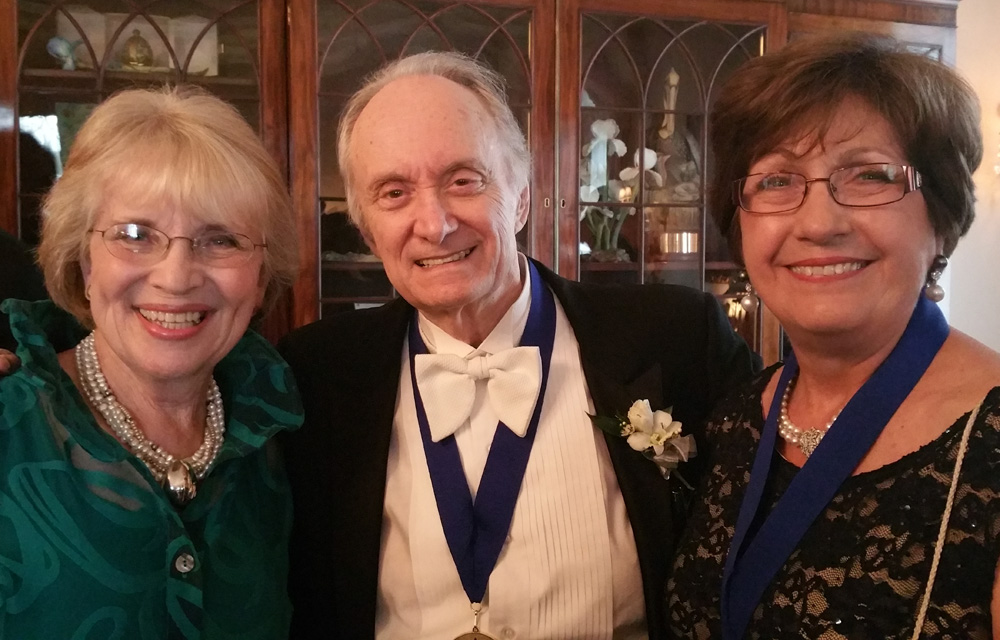
Beth Courtney with LA Legends Honorees, Rolland Golden & Governor Kathleen Blanco 2015

Among numerous awards, Golden was a two-time recipient of the Thomas Hart Benton Purchase Award, a three-time recipient of the National Arts Club First Place Award, and a winner of the Winslow Homer Memorial Award.

== Publications ==
=== Books ===
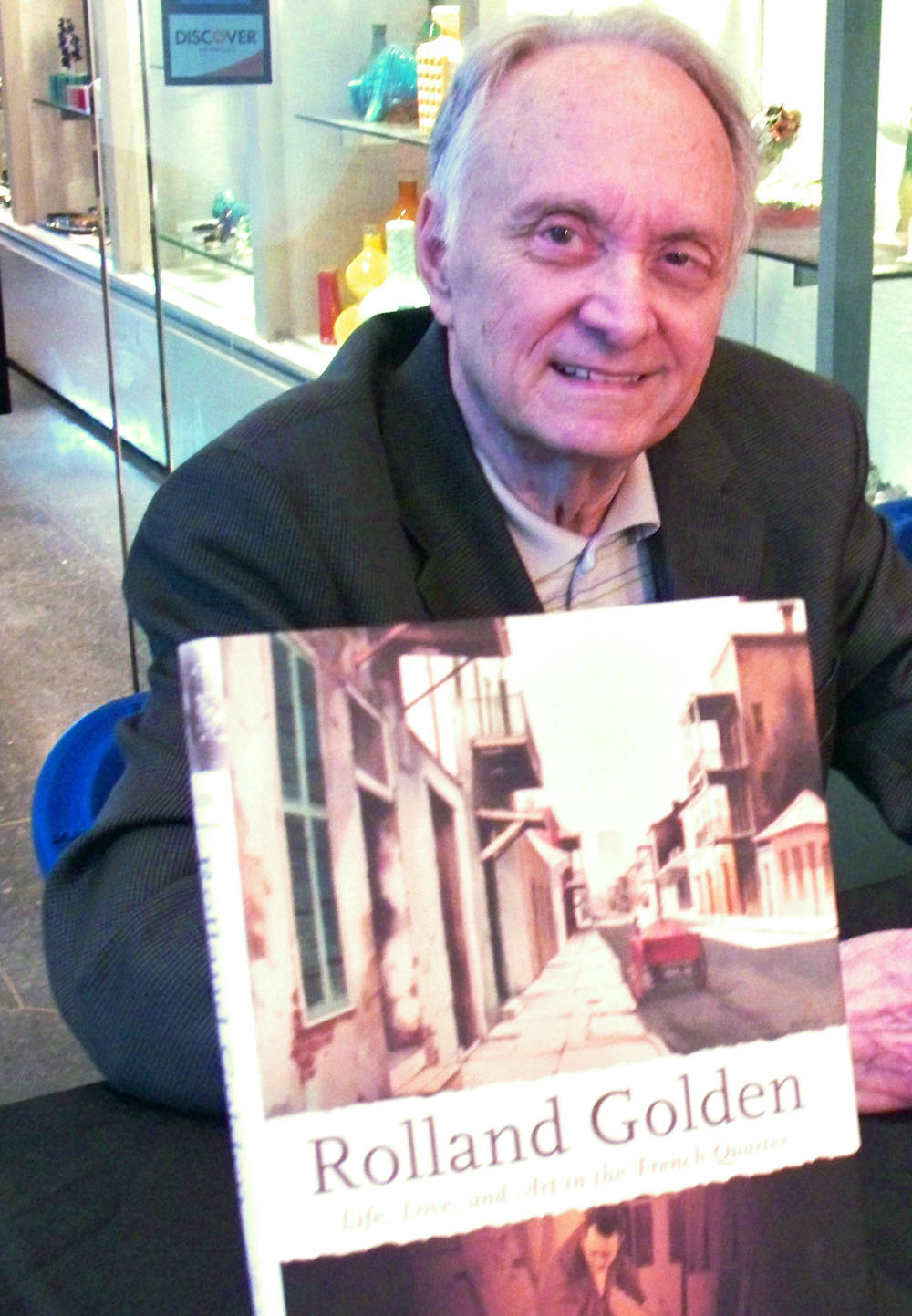
Rolland signing copies of is memoir at the New Orleans Museum of Art, September 2014

- Rolland Golden (author; illustrations). Lucille Golden (ed.). Life, Love, and Art in the French Quarter by Rolland Golden. University Press of Mississippi - 2014.
- Don Lee Keith (author); Rolland Golden (illustrations). World of Rolland Golden.
- John R. Kemp (author); Rolland Golden (illustrations) (2005). Rolland Golden: Journeys of a Southern Artist. Pelican Publishing Company.
- John R. Kemp (author); Rolland Golden (author; illustrations) (2007). Katrina: Days of Terror, Months of Anguish. New Orleans Museum of Art.
- Edith Long (author); Rolland Golden (drawings; illustrations); Sally Reeves (foreword) (2004). Along the Banquette: a reprinting of 1960s articles by Edith Long. VCPORA of New Orleans.
- John R. Kemp (2012). A Unique Slant of Light: The Bicentennial History of Art in Louisiana. Louisiana Endowment for the Humanities.

=== Magazines and newspapers ===
- Poki Hampton (2014). Inside Northside Magazine - cover. M&L Publishing, LLC.
- John R. Kemp (2003). Louisiana Life Magazine. New Orleans Magazine.
- Jamey Landry (2003). Inside Northside Magazine - cover. M&L Publishing, LLC.

== Memberships ==
Golden was a member of such art leagues as the Watercolor USA Honor Society (past Vice-President), The National Arts Club, National Watercolor Society, California, and Allied Artists of America, New York.
