= John McCrady =

American painter

- Born: September 11, 1911; Canton, Mississippi, United States
- Died: December 24, 1968 (aged 57)
- Education: Art Students League of New York, University of Mississippi, New Orleans School of Art
- Known for: Painting, Silkscreen
- Awards: Art Students League of New York scholarship, Guggenheim Fellowship

John McCrady (September 11, 1911 – December 24, 1968) was a Louisiana painter and printmaker. McCrady was born in Canton, Mississippi and was raised in the American South. After winning a scholarship from the Art Students League of New York for his "Portrait of a Negro," McCrady studied art with Thomas Hart Benton and Kenneth Hayes Miller. McCrady went on to become one of the best-known twentieth-century southern artists and was known for depicting scenes from the South, particularly images of southern African Americans. He also founded the McCrady Art School in 1942 on Bourbon Street in New Orleans.

== Life ==
McCrady's father was an Episcopal minister named Edward McCrady, and his mother was Mary Ormond Tucker. They lived in Greenwood, Mississippi, Hammond, Louisiana, and settled in Oxford, Mississippi in 1921 when Edward McCrady accepted a position to teach philosophy at the University of Mississippi. At 21 John McCrady left Mississippi and studied at the Arts and Crafts Club of New Orleans School of Art. He also studied at the Art Students League of New York, and the University of Pennsylvania. In 1938 McCrady married Mary Basso, a classmate from the New Orleans School of Art. They had a daughter three years later. In 1942 he opened the John McCrady School of Art; his students included Alan Flattmann, Kelly Gauley, Ida Kohlmeyer, Rolland Golden, and Robert Malcolm Rucker. In 1968 McCrady died suddenly after being diagnosed with cancer.

== Works ==
At twenty-one John McCrady studied art at the Arts and Crafts Club of New Orleans School of Art. From 1930 to 1932 McCrady attended the University of Mississippi and took courses at the Pennsylvania Academy of Fine Arts. McCrady took courses at the New Orleans Art School in 1932. McCrady won a scholarship in 1933 to the Art Students League of New York after submitting "Portrait of a Negro" a portrait of an African American man. In New York City, he studied with Kenneth Hayes Miller and Thomas Hart Benton. Benton’s sinewy anatomical style influenced McCrady’s work, while Miller introduced McCrady to a multistage technique used to paint oil transparencies over a tempera underpainting—a technique McCrady continued for the rest of his life. McCrady developed a style influenced by the Regionalism movement; he often painted the religious and social life of African-Americans and, received positive reviews for his work.

He worked for the Federal Art Project, creating a mural depicting an 1889 panoramic view of Amory, Mississippi's main street commissioned by Treasury Section of Fine Arts in the Amory, Mississippi post office titled Amory, Mississippi, 1889 and created murals for other federal buildings. He earned a Guggenheim Fellowship in 1939 “to paint the life and faith of the southern Negro.” In 1940 he joined the Associated American Artists and he was encouraged by Caroline Durieux to experiment with lithography. Under her direction, McCrady produced four silkscreens to aid the war effort. He produced only 9 lithographs in his career.

In 1942 McCrady made a series of war posters for the Graphic Section of the War Services Office, which was under the Works Progress Administration. In 1946 McCrady received criticism from The Daily Worker, a communist paper, calling his work “a flagrant example of racial chauvinism.” Shocked by these comments, McCrady drew back his artistic production for a decade. When he resumed his work he focused less attention to African American communities and concentrated on rural life, Mardi Gras, and The French Quarter.

In 1949 he received a grant from the American Academy of Arts and Letters. He had finished three murals for the Bank of Oxford in Oxford, Mississippi when he suddenly died. He had been diagnosed with cancer three weeks prior. Collections of his work are in the Georgia Museum of Art, the Saint Louis Art Museum, the Louisiana State Museum, and the University of Mississippi Museum. The Historic New Orleans Collection maintains some of McCrady’s papers, as well as the records of the John McCrady School of Art.

== Notable works ==
- Portrait of a Negro
- Frightened Horses
- Swing Low, Sweet Chariot
- The Shooting of Huey Long
- Robert E. Lee and Natchez
