= Robert Rucker =

Robert Rucker may refer to:

- Robert D. Rucker (born 1952), justice on the Indiana Supreme Court
- Robert M. Rucker (born 1967), American jazz drummer, music teacher and composer
- Robert Malcolm Rucker (1932–2001), American impressionistic artist
