= Alexander Lambert =

Polish pianist and a piano teacher (1863–1929)

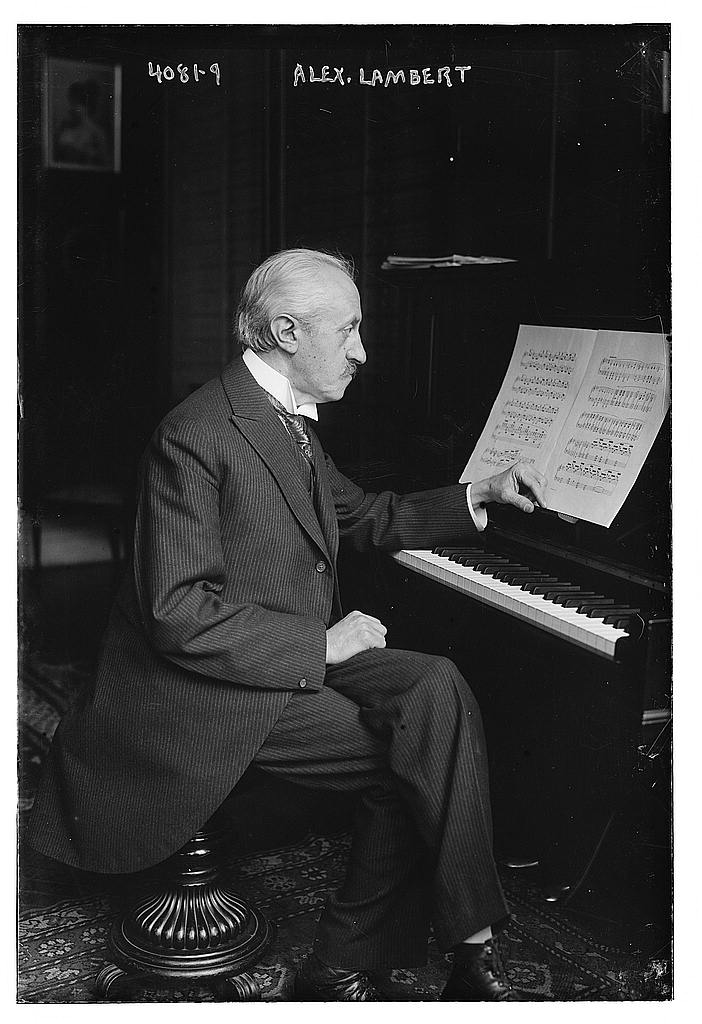
- Lambert in 1916
- Born: November 1, 1863; Warsaw, Congress Poland
- Died: December 31, 1929 (aged 66); New York City, US
- Occupations: Pianist, music teacher

Alexander Lambert (November 1, 1863 – December 31, 1929) was a Polish and American pianist and piano teacher.

== Biography ==
He was born on November 1, 1863, in Warsaw, Poland, to Henry Lambert.

He graduated from the Vienna Conservatory of Music in 1878.

After moving to New York, he was faculty of New York College of Music. His students included Jerome Kern, Alfred Newman, Anita Socola Specht, and Fannie Morris Spencer. He also taught at the Curtis Institute of Music in Philadelphia. His book, Piano Method for Beginners, was published by G. Schirmer.

He died on New Year's Eve 1929 in Manhattan when he was struck and killed by a taxicab driver. He left an estate with a net value of $273,457, equivalent to $5,400,000 in 2025, and was buried in Washington Cemetery in Brooklyn. The pallbearers at his funeral included Walter Damrosch, Daniel Frohman, Sergei Rachmaninoff, Artur Bodanzky, Walter W. Naumburg, Efrem Zimbalist, and Jascha Heifetz and Josef Hofmann who also played music.
