= Henry Wehrmann =

Henry Wehrmann was an American engraver of the 19th century. With his wife, he became a successful engraver in the South in the early 1850s and during the American Civil War. They published a collection of Louisiana Creole songs and at least one work by Marguerite Samuel, Vers le Soir.
