= Marguerite Samuel =

American composer and pianist

Marguerite Elie Samuel
- Born: 17 May 1847; New Orleans, Louisiana, United States
- Died: 27 October 1912 (aged 65); Florence, Italy
- Education: Paris Conservatory
- Occupation(s): Composer, pianist, music educator
- Years active: 1856–1901
- Notable work: Vers le Soir, Ma Vie a Son Secret

Marguerite Elie Samuel (17 May 1847 - 27 Oct 1912) was an American composer and pianist who spent many years in France. She published her music as Mme. L. Samuel.

Samuel was born in New Orleans, Louisiana, to Marie Waller and Paul Adolphe Elie, a violinist. She was a gifted pianist and showed a talent for improvisation at a young age. Her initial public performance was on 25 April 1856, when she was only nine years old. As was common in 19th century New Orleans, Samuel was sent to Paris in 1856 for further education at the Paris Conservatory. Her teachers at the Conservatory and in Paris at large included Daniel Francois Esprit Auber, Fromenthal Halevy, Henri Herz, Gioachino Rossini, Camille-Marie Stamaty, Julius Schulhoff, Victor Tasse (probably Victor Masse), and Ambroise Thomas. She won first and second prizes at the Conservatory, and socialized or performed with Jean-Delphin Alard, Georges Bizet, Ernest Guiraud, Camille Pleyel, and Jose Silvestre White.

In 1865 when the American Civil War ended, Samuel visited New Orleans and performed there for six months. She returned to Paris in April 1866, where she married Leopold Samuel and stopped performing publicly while she had two daughters. A third child, a son, died young. In 1876, Leopold Samuel suffered severe financial losses. His wife and their two daughters moved back to New Orleans to live with her parents, who were running a music store at 145 Canal Street. The couple remained apart until Leopold’s death in 1898. Marguerite gave piano lessons at her parents’ store and joined the faculty of the Southern Academic Institute in 1889. Her pupils included Helena Augustin, Ella Grunewald, Edna Flotte Ricau, Eugenie Wehrmann Schaffner, and Anita Socola Sprecht.

While in New Orleans, Samuel performed with Bernard Bruenn, Lydia Eustis, Jeanne Faure, Mark Kaiser and his string quartet, Lilli Lehmann (who premiered Samuel’s song “Ma Vie a Son Secret”), Ovide Musin, Raoul Pugno, and Guillaume Ricci. In 1889, Samuel helped form the New Orleans Musicians’ Guild and served as its music director.

The last newspaper review of Samuel’s public performances was in March 1901. In 1912, she moved to Florence, Italy, where she lived with her daughter until her death in October of that year.

At least one of Samuel’s compositions (Vers le Soir) was printed by Mrs. Henry Wehrmann. Her parents published and sold music at their store, including their daughter’s works, which included:

== Works ==
=== Piano ===
- Chant Seraphique (by Alexandre Guilmant; arranged for piano by Marguerite Samuel)
- Hearts and Tears
- Serenade Boccaccio (by Franz von Suppe; arranged for piano by Marguerite Samuel)
- Vers le Soir, opus 1

=== Vocal ===
- “Cooling” (text by Pearl Rivers)
- “Ma Vie a Son Secret” (text by Felix Arvers)
