= Anita Socola Specht =

American composer and musician

Anita Socola Specht (June 1871 - November 11, 1958) was an American composer, pianist, and singer who was president of the Louisiana State Federation of Music Clubs and helped found the New Orleans Symphony Orchestra.

Specht was born in Louisiana to Eliza Curien and Angelo Socola. She had five brothers who were actors. By 1889, Socola began lessons under the guidance of Marguerite Elie Samuel at the Southern Academic Institute at 216 Coliseum Street. This would have put her in touch with some of New Orleans' musical elite, including the Wehrmann family. Through Samuel, Socola had many opportunities to perform at venues and benefit concerts throughout New Orleans. She was only 13 when she made her debut at the Grunewald Opera House, where she met her future husband, conductor William Henry Bernard Specht. They married in 1906 had one son.

Specht was fluent in French and Spanish. She studied music in New Orleans, Chicago, and New York City. Her teachers included Alexander Lambert, Herbert Rolling, Marguerite Samuel, and William Charles Ernest Seeboeck. She won the title “best amateur pianist in the United States” at the 1893 World's Columbian Exposition in Chicago, although some of the judges told her, “You are not an amateur, you are an artist!”

Specht helped found the New Orleans Symphony Orchestra (today the Louisiana Philharmonic Orchestra) in 1887, and was elected president of the Louisiana State Federation of Music Clubs in 1921. Her correspondence with her husband is archived in the William Russell Jazz Collection of the Historic New Orleans Collection. Her compositions include a Nocturne arranged for orchestra as well as several piano pieces. Before her death in 1958, Specht established the still-active Giunio Socola Memorial Award for excellence in public debate at the Jesuit High School of New Orleans.

== Works ==
Nocturne. New Orleans: Grunewald Co., Ltd, 1895 [Dedicated to Louis Grunewald]
