= Isaac Delgado =

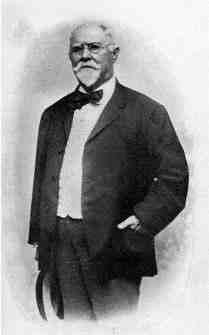
Delgado

Isaac Delgado (c. 1839–1912) was a businessman and sugar dealer who migrated from Jamaica to New Orleans in the late nineteenth century. His success in business made him sufficiently wealthy to become a significant benefactor with philanthropic interests in the arts, medicine, and education.

He founded the New Orleans Museum of Art, originally called the Isaac Delgado Museum.

The current fifty-seven-acre City Park Campus of Delgado Community College in New Orleans was originally established in 1921 as Delgado Central Trades School, a manual trade school for young boys. The land was purchased with funds bequeathed by Delgado to the City of New Orleans in 1909.
