= Le Petit Theatre du Vieux Carre =

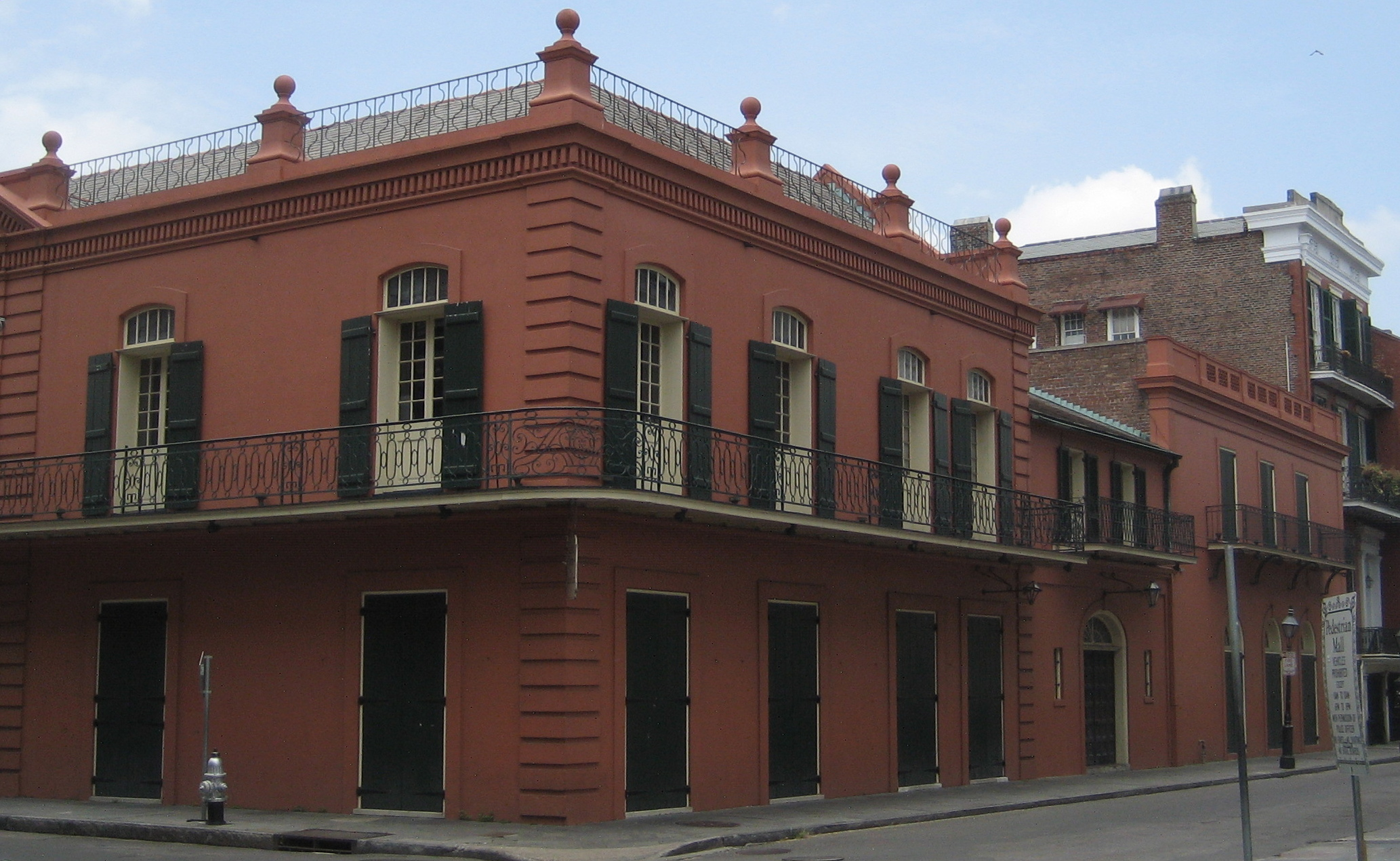
- Le Petit Theatre building seen from Jackson Square in 2008
- Interactive map of Le Petit Theatre du Vieux Carre
- Address: 616 St. Peter Street
- Location: New Orleans LA 70116
- Coordinates: 29.9575°N 90.0642°W
- Seating type: Reserved seating

Website
- www.lepetittheatre.com

Le Petit Théâtre Du Vieux Carré is a small professional theatre in the French Quarter of New Orleans, Louisiana.

The building complex holds a professionally equipped theatre. Le Petit is run by a Board of Governors, with productions staged by professional staff. Le Petit Theatre offers Equity and non-union contracts, and pays all performers and technicians. Many visiting artists are professionals in music, dance, TV, or other performing arts.

During its 95 years of operation, Le Petit has been recognized as one of the leading "little" or community theatres in the nation.

== History ==
=== Early history ===
Le Petit was founded in 1916, when a group of amateur theatre-lovers began putting on plays in the drawing room of one of the members.

The audiences of the Drawing Room Players grew, and the founders rented space on the second floor of 503 St. Ann in the lower Pontalba Buildings, for $17.50 per month. Irish playwright Lord Dunsany, visiting the city, formally launched the new playhouse.

In 1922, the theatre bought the property for its present location at the corner of St. Peter and Chartres Streets. Three small shed-like buildings facing St. Peter Street were removed and the present theatre building was constructed in 1922. Architect Richard Koch designed the theatre in authentic Spanish Colonial style. The structure incorporated a 1790s colonial building on the corner, which was renovated and helped inspire the style of the rest of the structure; this building, reconstructed in 1963, originally held reception rooms, offices, dressing rooms, and a smaller theatre.

=== Closure and reopening ===
In March 2009, facing severe financial difficulties, Le Petit's board of governors voted to lay off the theatre's artistic director and staff, and appointed The Solomon Group, a New Orleans entertainment company, as interim manager. The board terminated the Solomon Group's management in October 2010, and in December 2010 announced that the rest of its 2010–11 season would be cancelled. The theatre continued to provide a venue for fundraising efforts and outside productions.

In May 2011 it was reported that the New Orleans-based Dickie Brennan family of restaurants was negotiating to take space for a restaurant in the building, allowing the theatre to maintain its operations. The next month, 60% of the building was sold to Dickie Brennan in a deal that retired the theatre's $700,000 debt and paved the way for much needed renovations to the deteriorating building. Brennan opened Tableau, a Creole restaurant, in a portion of the building and shares space with the theatre, which retained ownership of the original stage, executive offices, dressing rooms, and an educational space.

In May 2013, the theatre launched a revamped website, appointed Cassie Worley its new executive director, and announced plans for a preseason or lagniappe production of Nora Ephron and Delia Ephron's Love, Loss and What I Wore in July and a regular season of plays opening September 6, with Lombardi.

=== Later history ===
In March 2015, the theatre hired Maxwell Williams as the Artistic Director. In December 2017, the theatre hired Don-Scott Cooper as the Executive Director.

== See also ==
- Theatre in Louisiana
