= Robert Malcolm Rucker =

American painter

Robert Malcolm Rucker (March 28, 1932 – March 7, 2001) was an American painter of primarily of impressionist art. At the age of sixteen he opened his first art gallery in the French Quarter section of New Orleans.

== Background ==
Having been born the son of Edward Augustus Rucker, a noted Louisiana steamboat captain, many of Rucker's works focus on the southern countryside of the Mississippi Delta. Following a long day of swimming in the Mississippi River, Rucker developed a severe case of poliomyelitis at the age of seventeen. As a result of his illness, the Louisiana Department of Education funded Rucker's education at the John McCrady School of Fine Arts located on Bourbon Street in New Orleans. Later following his graduation, Rucker worked briefly as a medical school illustrator for Tulane University School of Medicine.

== Later life ==
Rucker is known as one of Louisiana's most renowned artists. He is known to have generated thousands of paintings during his lifetime. He is the father to three daughters Lynn, Yvonne, and Janet. In 1997 Rucker was named a "Louisiana Legend" by the Louisiana Public Broadcasting. On March 7, 2001, Rucker died of a heart attack.
