= Paul Ninas =

American painter

Paul Ninas (May 7, 1903—January 14, 1964) was an American artist. He was born in Leeton, Missouri. He began to study engineering at the University of Nebraska before he travelled around the Middle East and North Africa, which inspired him to become a painter. He studied painting in Vienna in 1922–1925. He then moved to Paris where he studied at the Académie des Beaux-Arts and was influenced by fauvism and cubism. He was also associated with the dancer Isadora Duncan as well as the Montparnasse model Kiki, who also modeled for Man Ray. After time in North Africa and Dominica, where he bought a coconut and lime plantation, he returned to the United States in 1932 following his father's death. He settled in New Orleans where he would live from 1932 until his death in 1964. He was active in the city's art community and his European style was well received. He was described as the "dean of modern art" in New Orleans. he was married twice (including fellow artist Jane Ninas) and has one daughter.

Paul Ninas’ work is pivotal in the development of modern art in the South and, more particularly in New Orleans. Through Ninas’ work as a teacher and as an active exhibiting artist, he introduced European modernist ideas to what had been hitherto a fairly traditional way of making art in the South. Aside from the obvious comparisons to Gauguin, the later work of Ninas is a dialogue with Pablo Picasso and translating his synthetic Cubist style into distinctly Southern subjects. Ninas especially sees New Orleans through a Cubist lens, depicting cemeteries, Mardi Gras parades and harbor scenes with angular, colorful flair.
