= New Orleans Museum of Art =

Art museum in Louisiana, US

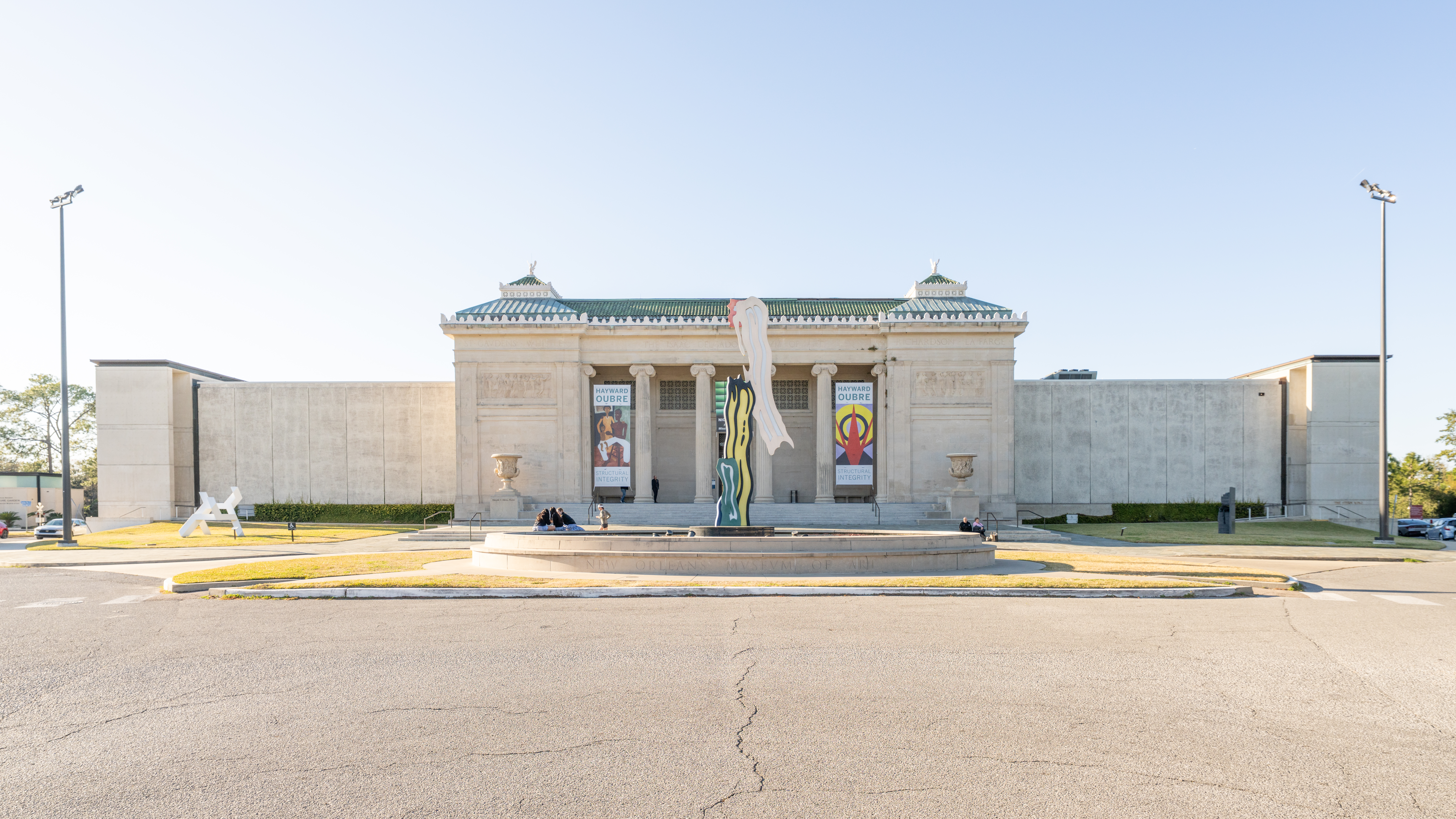
- With Roy Lichtenstein's "Five Brushstrokes" (2026)
- Interactive fullscreen map
- Established: 1911
- Location: One Collins C. Diboll Circle, City Park, New Orleans, Louisiana, USA 70124
- Coordinates: 29°59′11″N 90°05′36″W
- Director: Susan Taylor
- Website: www.noma.org

The New Orleans Museum of Art (or NOMA) is the oldest fine arts museum in the city of New Orleans. It is situated within City Park, a short distance from the intersection of Carrollton Avenue and Esplanade Avenue, and near the terminus of the "Canal Street - City Park" streetcar line. It was established in 1911 as the Delgado Museum of Art.

== Museum ==
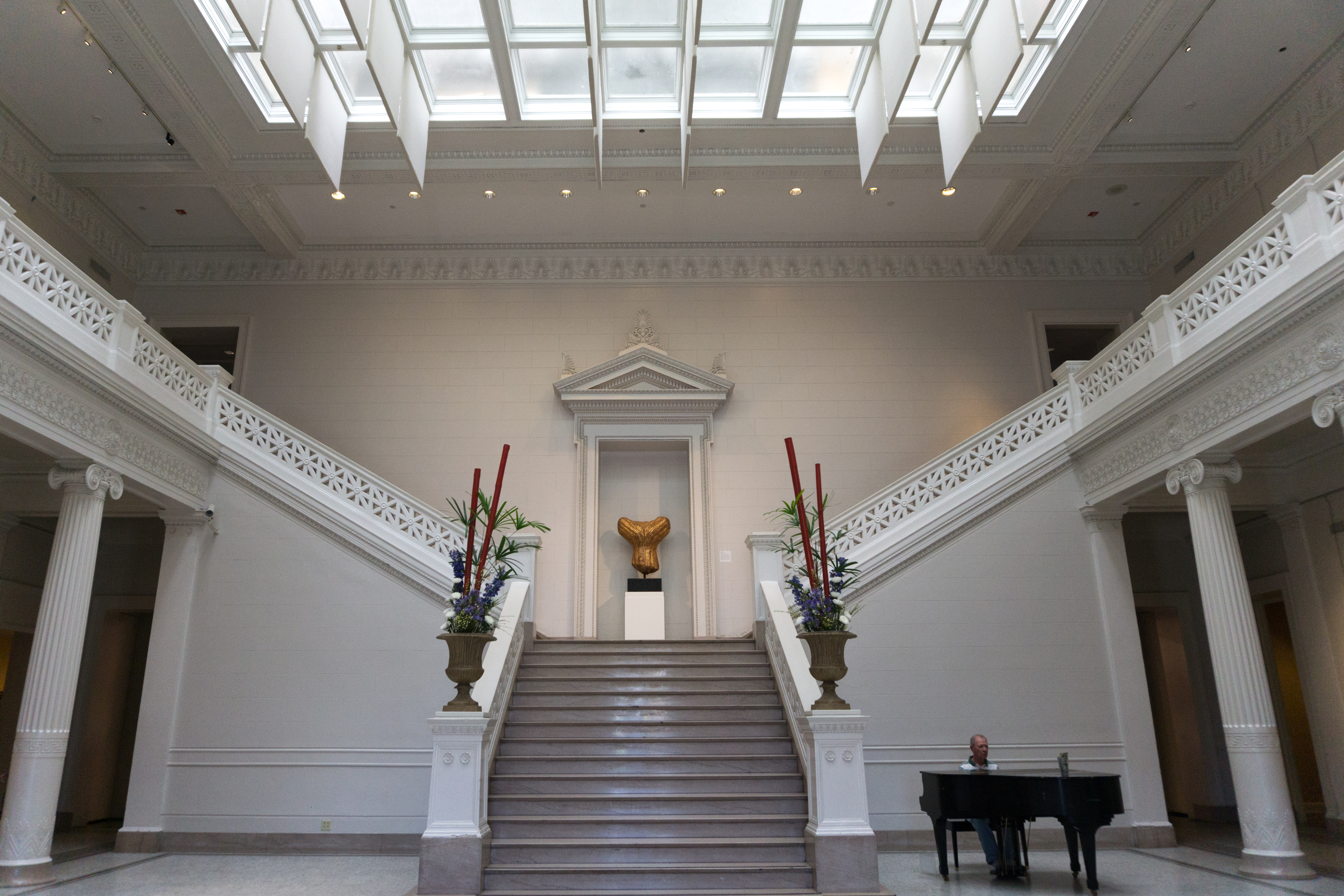
Interior of NOMA

The New Orleans Museum of Art (NOMA) was initially funded through a charitable grant by local philanthropist and art collector Isaac Delgado. The museum building itself was partly designed by the former chief engineer of New Orleans Benjamin Morgan Harrod.

At the age of 71 Delgado, a wealthy sugar broker, wrote to the City Park Board about his intention to build an art museum in New Orleans. "I have been led to believe that you would willingly donate in the park the site for a building I propose erecting to be known as the 'Isaac Delgado Museum of Art'. My desire is to give to the citizens of New Orleans a fire proof building where works of art may be collected through gifts or loans and where exhibits can be held from time to time by the Art Association of New Orleans". The board approved his request and designated the circle, at the end of what would become Lelong Avenue, for the museum. On December 11, 1911, the Isaac Delgado Museum of Art opened its doors. Delgado did not attend the opening due to medical issues; he died soon after on January 4, 1912.

In 1970/1971, the Edward Wisner Foundation funded the Wisner Education Wing, which is a three level addition to NOMA's left side. 1993 brought the opening of the $23 million expansion and renovation project to NOMA. The scale of the expansion and renovation, combined with amplified art acquisitions, positioned NOMA into the top 25 percent of the nation's largest and most important fine art museums. Today, the art museum is rated among the best art institutions in the country, having presented many unique and rare exhibits.

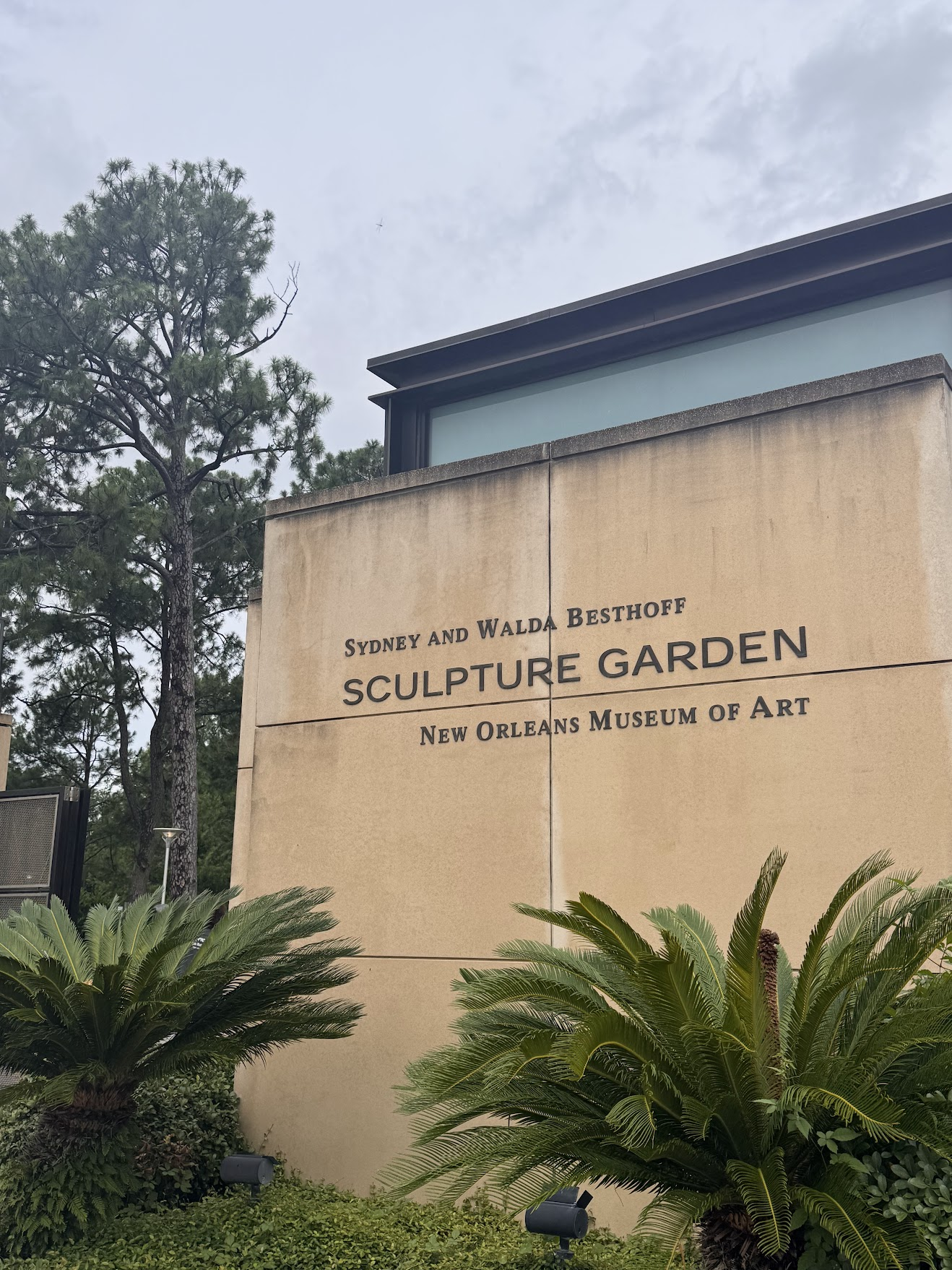
The entrance to the Sydney and Walda Besthoff Sculpture Garden at the New Orleans Museum of Art, showcasing the garden's name prominently on the wall.

NOMA includes the Sydney and Walda Besthoff Sculpture Garden, an 11.5-acre (47,000 m^{2}) landscaped area behind the main building. The gated garden features over 90 modern and contemporary sculptures set among live oaks, pines, magnolias, camellias, lagoons, several bridges, and a walking trail.

The museum also includes the NOMA Museum Shop, an auditorium for film screenings, artist talks, panels and presentations, and Café NOMA, a restaurant by Ralph Brennan.

Although City Park suffered extensive damage from Hurricane Katrina, the museum is elevated and located on relatively high ground. As such, flooding was restricted to the basement, and most of the museum's permanent collection was not affected by the storm.

== Collection ==
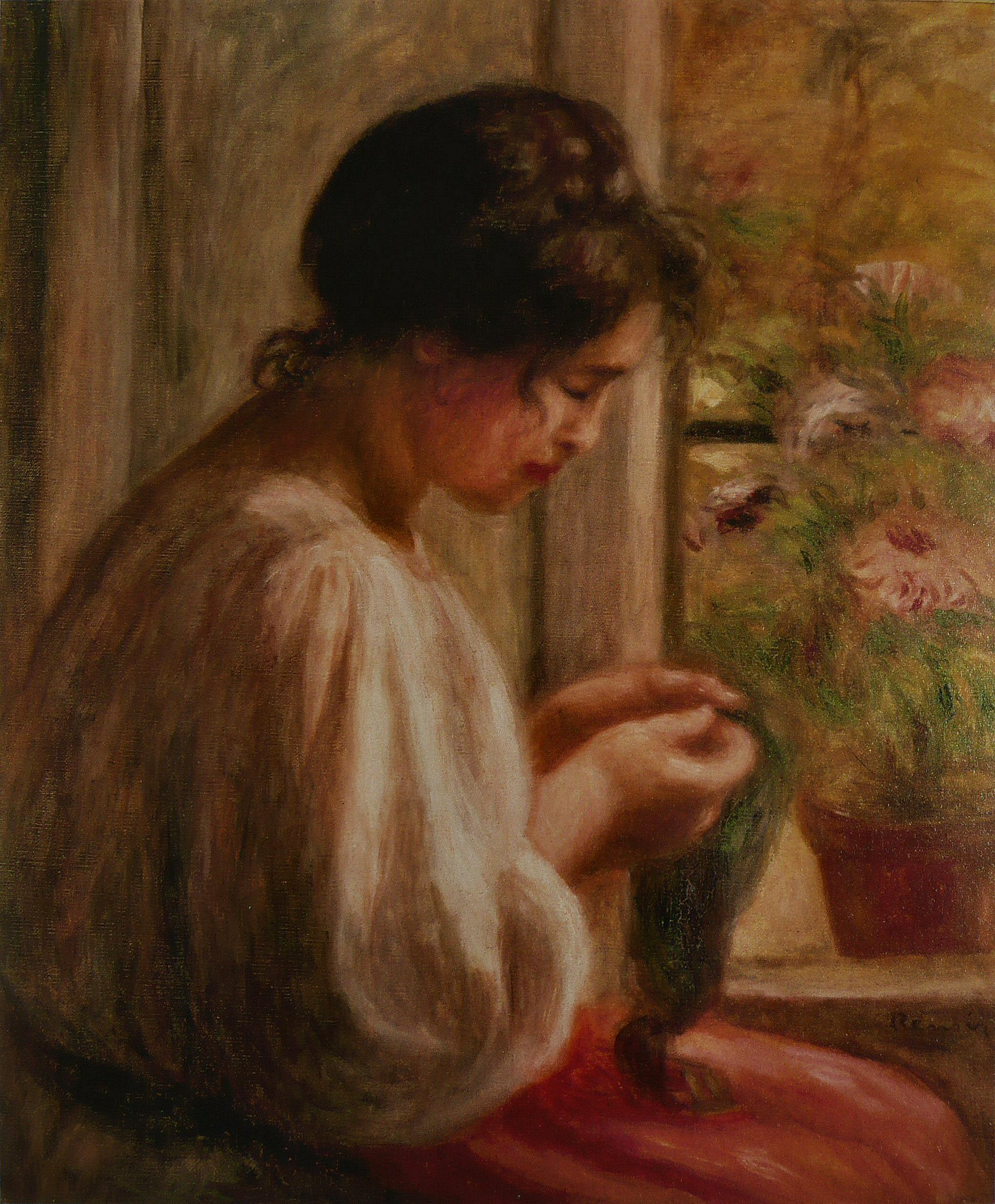
Renoir's Seamstress at the Window

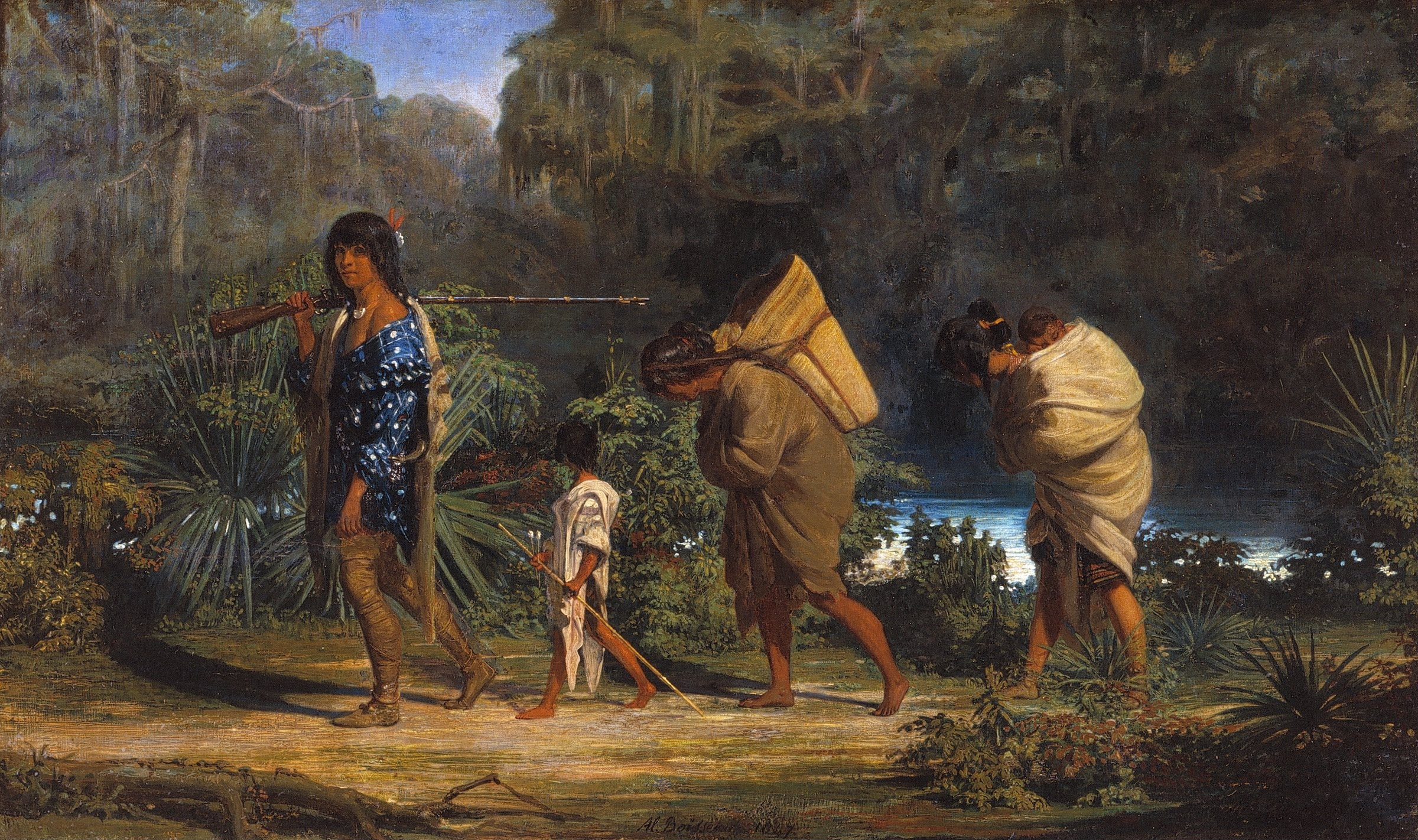
Louisiana Indians Walking Along a Bayou - Alfred Boisseau, 1847

The permanent collection at the museum features more than 40,000 objects spanning 5,000 years of art, including the Italian Renaissance to the modern era.

The museum is noted for its collection of European and American works, including works by Degas, Monet, Renoir, Picasso, Pissarro, Rodin, Braque, Dufy, Miró, Jackson Pollock, Mary Cassatt, and Georgia O'Keeffe. The museum features a comprehensive survey of French art, including several important works painted by the French Impressionist Edgar Degas during his time living with his mother's family in New Orleans between 1871 and 1872.

Among the permanent exhibition is a survey of local Louisiana artists, as well as other American artists. The museum also features a significant collection of art photography with over 12,000 works from the beginnings of photography to the present., Other holdings include collections of glass, ceramics, portrait miniatures, Native American Art, Central American art from pre-Columbian and Spanish eras, Chinese ceramics, Japanese painting, Indian sculpture and folk arts from Africa, Indonesia, and the South Pacific.

== Events ==
The museum works in close collaboration with other local museums, especially The Historic New Orleans Collection and the Louisiana State Museum, in developing its special exhibitions. Special exhibitions in the past have included the treasures of Tutankhamun's tomb, relics of Alexander the Great and his times, artifacts from the Louisiana Purchase and that era, a retrospective of Edgar Degas in Louisiana, "Femme! Femme! Femme!" featuring depictions of women in 18th century French painting, "Carneval!" focusing on pre-Lenten festivals across several European and American cultures (including Mardi Gras in New Orleans), and several anniversary exhibitions related to Hurricane Katrina.

The museum offers guided group tours, teacher workshops, online teacher guides, and visits to local schools and community centers through a pop-up museum called NOMA+. The museum also hosts festivals, film screenings, music programs, lectures, and wellness activities.
