= The Historic New Orleans Collection =

Museum and publisher in New Orleans, Louisiana

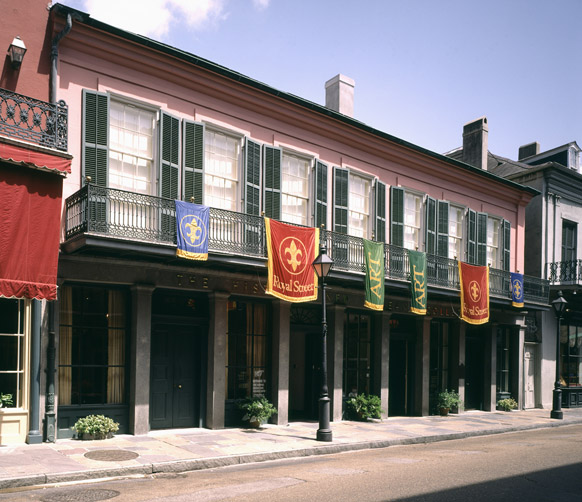
- Established: 1966
- Location: Royal Street Complex: 520 Royal Street, New Orleans, Louisiana, US Williams Research Center: 410 Chartres Street; New Orleans
- Coordinates: 29.956886847778527°N 90.06562516865378°W
- President: Daniel Hammer
- Website: www.hnoc.org

The Historic New Orleans Collection (HNOC) is a museum, research center, and publisher dedicated to the study and preservation of the history and culture of New Orleans and the Gulf South region of the United States. It is located in New Orleans' French Quarter. The institution was established in 1966 by Kemper and Leila Williams to keep their collection of Louisiana materials intact and available for research and exhibition to the public.

The Collection operates a museum, which includes the Williams Gallery, Louisiana History Galleries, the Williams Residence, a house museum, and a museum shop. The Williams Research Center, which opened in 1996, makes HNOC's holdings available to researchers. The holdings consist of some 35,000 library items, and approximately 350,000 photographs, prints, drawings, paintings, and other artifacts.

Museum exhibitions have been presented on a wide variety of topics relating to the history and culture of the Gulf South region and the peoples who have influenced it, ranging from the Battle of New Orleans to the development of New Orleans cuisine to more modern subjects, such as the Sugar Bowl and life after Hurricane Katrina. Many of the museum's exhibits are free and open to the public.

== History ==
In 1938, General Lewis Kemper Williams (1887-1971), a World War I veteran, Brigadier General in World War II, businessman, and honorary Consul General of Monaco in New Orleans, and his wife, Leila Hardie Moore Williams (1901-1966) bought two properties in the French Quarter, the Spanish Colonial Merieult House on Royal Street and a late 19th-century residence next to the Merieult House, facing Toulouse Street. The latter was their home for 17 years, during which time they amassed a substantial collection of important Louisiana materials. With the deaths of Leila and Kemper Williams, in 1966 and 1971 respectively, a foundation bearing their names was established, creating The Historic New Orleans Collection.

== Museum buildings ==
=== Merieult House ===
The Merieult House on 533 Royal Street serves as the entrance to the Historic New Orleans Collection and main museum facility. Dating from the 18th century, the house occupies land that has been in continuous use since the early colonial days in the 1720s. The house is listed on the National Register of Historic Places. THNOC opened the Louisiana History Galleries on the second floor and located the museum shop and the Williams Gallery for changing exhibitions about Louisiana's history on the first floor.

=== Williams Residence ===
Built in 1889, the Williams Residence is an Italianate, two-story brick historic house museum with galleries. The history of the property dates to Jean François Merieult, who, after purchasing the Royal Street lot in 1792, increased his land a few years later, adding depth to the lot toward Bourbon Street where he erected a warehouse. The residence, surrounded by three courtyards, is often described as a hidden house. The furnishings and decor today remain as they were in the 1940s and 1950s when the Williamses lived there. Tours are offered daily.

== Other buildings ==
=== Counting House ===
The Counting House is named for the banking activities conducted on site in the 19th century. It was built as a warehouse by Jean François Merieult between 1794 and 1795. Today, the first floor is used for office space, meetings, receptions, and exhibitions when additional space is needed.

=== Maisonette ===
Across the courtyard from the Counting House, the three-story Maisonette stretches along the Toulouse Street side of THNOC. This service wing was constructed over an earlier structure that was built at the same time as the Merieult House in the 1790s. The Maisonette houses staff offices.

=== Townhouse ===
This two-story brick building, dating from the late 19th century, was used as a banking house, according to an act of sale in 1888. Leila Moore Williams purchased the property in 1947 and sold it in 1965. The townhouse once again became part of The Collection when the Williams Foundation purchased it in 1980.

=== Guillot House ===
The house that Luis Adam built in 1788, after the first great New Orleans fire destroyed an earlier structure, appears to have escaped the second great New Orleans fire of 1794. In the 1930s, the house was opened to boarders and for a short time a young Tennessee Williams lived there. Restoration to the original Spanish Colonial style did not occur until the 1970s.

=== Creole Cottage ===
The double cottage on Toulouse Street was purchased by the Collection in 1990. During the summer of 1991, an archaeological dig revealed evidence of all the structures that existed prior to the house now on the site. Archaeologists found indications of French barracks from the 1720s; a structure burned in the fire of 1788; a residence from the period 1790 to 1820; and debris related to the existing cottage that was built around 1830.

=== Williams Research Center ===
Built in 1915 in the Beaux Arts style, the two-story brick structure was erected to house the Second City Criminal Court and the Third District Police Station. After an extensive restoration, the Chartres Street building opened as the Williams Research Center in January 1996. The Collection's rare and important holdings at the Williams Research Center are available to the general public via the public reading room. The building's annex, which opened in 2007, was the first new construction completed in the French Quarter since Hurricane Katrina.

== Notable collections ==
In addition to its massive collection of New Orleans-related maps, photographs, surveys and other documents, the Historic New Orleans Collection contains a number of collections of rare or otherwise specialty materials.

=== Tennessee Williams Collection ===
In 2001, THNOC acquired the largest private collection of Tennessee Williams materials anywhere in the world from collector Fred Todd. In addition to the many typescripts and manuscripts of works such as A Streetcar Named Desire and The Glass Menagerie, there are dozens of playbills, as well as signed first editions of Williams' plays and other works, unpublished letters, a myriad books about Williams, translations of his work, film scripts, and photos of Williams with friends and associates. The more rare items include notes on the filming of The Rose Tattoo, an operatic version of Summer and Smoke, a playscript for a western, a prose-poem to lover Frank Merlo, and numerous promotional materials and memorabilia from Baby Doll, including the film script with notes from director Elia Kazan and some of Williams' own financial records.

Additionally, the Historic New Orleans Collection publishes the Tennessee Williams Annual Review, the only regularly published journal devoted exclusively to the works of Tennessee Williams. It is available in print and electronically.

=== William Russell Jazz Collection ===
The William Russell Jazz Collection is an extensive collection of jazz memorabilia including musical instruments, records, piano rolls, sheet music, photographs, books and periodicals. It traces the development of jazz in New Orleans and follows the movement of musicians to New York City, Chicago, California and beyond. It encompasses notes from Mr. Russell's research, audiotapes, programs, posters, correspondence, films, business cards, notes, clippings, and scrapbooks. Large portions of the collection focus on the lives of Manuel "Fess" Manetta, Bunk Johnson, and Jelly Roll Morton. The collection includes correspondence between composer Anita Socola Specht and her husband, conductor William Specht. The collection also features materials on brass bands, ragtime, gospel music, and William Russell's own compositions.

=== William C. Cook War of 1812 in the South Collection ===
The William C. Cook collection focuses on the War of 1812 in the South, particularly the Creek War, the war in the Gulf of Mexico, and the Battle of New Orleans. Major General Andrew Jackson, military commander during these events, is well represented, and the collection also includes various important U.S. Army and militia documents, as well as materials concerning the participation of the southern Indian tribes and manuscripts from the British perspective. Also present are related materials concerning the War of 1812 in the South from a later date, the largest single grouping of which contains campaign materials from the 1828 presidential election. These principally focus on the 1815 execution of the six militia men that were most dramatically executed in the infamous "Coffin broadsides."

=== Clarence John Laughlin Collection ===
THNOC also maintains the substantial Clarence John Laughlin collection, which contains film negatives, transparencies, photographs and prints spanning the decades from the 1930s to the 1980s, taken both by and of Laughlin. The collection documents Laughlin's life and work throughout both New Orleans and the world.

=== Germans in New Orleans ===
The Williams Research Center contains an abundance of materials relating to New Orleans' German settlers, organizations, music, businesses, and rural German enclaves. The collection includes an assortment of prints, photographs, postcards, letterheads, maps, sheet music and other objects. The J. Hanno Deiler Papers contain hand-written and typescript drafts of the historian's major books, articles, and speeches, as well as a number of genealogies of Louisiana-German families.

=== Sugar Bowl archives ===
Prior to 2007 the Sugar Bowl maintained its archives at the Mercedes-Benz Superdome. However, the Superdome was damaged by Hurricane Katrina; and although the archives were not damaged, the Bowl decided the archives needed a more suitable home and donated the materials to the Collection.

== See also ==
- National Register of Historic Places listings in Orleans Parish, Louisiana
- History of New Orleans
- French Quarter
- List of historical societies in Louisiana
