= Ruth Landers =

German-born television producer, manager, and businesswoman (1938 –2024)

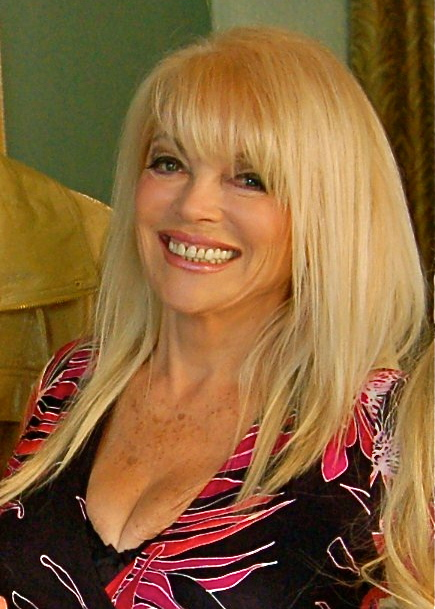
- Born: Ruth Béate Landers; May 17, 1938; Frankfurt, Germany
- Died: April 18, 2024 (aged 85); Sarasota, Florida
- Occupations: Producer, manager
- Notable work: Club Fed, producer
- Television: The Huggabug Club
- Relatives: Audrey Landers, Judy Landers, daughters

Ruth Béate Landers (May 17, 1938 – April 18, 2024) was a television producer, manager, businesswoman and mother of actresses Audrey and Judy Landers.

== Background ==
Ruth Landers was born in 1938 in Frankfurt, Germany. Her family fled to Shanghai in November 1938 after Kristallnacht. She immigrated to the United States in 1948. Her eldest daughter Audrey was born in Philadelphia in 1959.

In 1973, she established a printing company called Office Research Corporation, which she sold in 2000. In the 1980s, Landers began to establish herself as a producer of television and films, alongside managing her daughters Audrey's and Judy's careers.

=== The Huggabug Club ===
In 1995, she created and executive produced the children's television series The Huggabug Club (1995–2000). The family self funded the production, which initially launched on 70 PBS stations, soon growing to 144 the next spring. Landers would later donate the rights to The Huggabug Club to PBS.

=== Landers STAR Collection ===
In 1998, Landers moved to Sarasota, Florida to live near her daughters. They discovered the town after visiting while doing live performances for The Huggabug Club. In Florida, Landers would go on to develop a line of affordable fashion for women alongside her daughters, which she sold through Home Shopping Europe, QVC and Shop NBC called Landers STAR Collection. The fashion line was inspired by the Landers family's personal taste and desire to create a collection wearable by mothers, daughters and grandmothers.

Landers died of natural causes in Sarasota on April 18, 2024.

== Executive Producer ==
- 1986 Rock Candy
- 1989 Ghost Writer
- 1989 Club Fed
- 1991 California Casanova
- 2006 Circus Island
