= For Heaven's Sake (2008 film) =

- Directed by: Nat Christian
- Written by: Ann Marcus
- Produced by: Nat Christian
- Starring: Florence Henderson; Allison Lange; David Paetkau
- Cinematography: Michael Hardwick
- Edited by: Jeffrey Gove
- Music by: James Barth
- Distributed by: FilmHub
- Release date: September 23, 2008
- Running time: 90 minutes
- Country: United States
- Language: English

For Heaven's Sake is a comedy written by former Emmy Award winner, Ann Marcus. The film was directed and produced by Nat Christian. It stars Florence Henderson, Allison Lange, David Paetkau, Yaani King, Kathryn Gordon, Stephanie Patton, Joseph Campanella and Skyler Gisondo.

The film was released in 2008 by Vanguard Cinema.

== Cast ==
- Florence Henderson as Sarah Miller
- Allison Lange as Young Sarah Miller
- David Paetkau as Young David
- Yaani King Mondschein as Ashley (credited as Yaani King)
- Kathryn Gordon as Amy
- Joseph Campanella as Donald Meeks
- Stephanie Patton as Katie
