= Audrey Landers =

American actress and singer (born 1956)

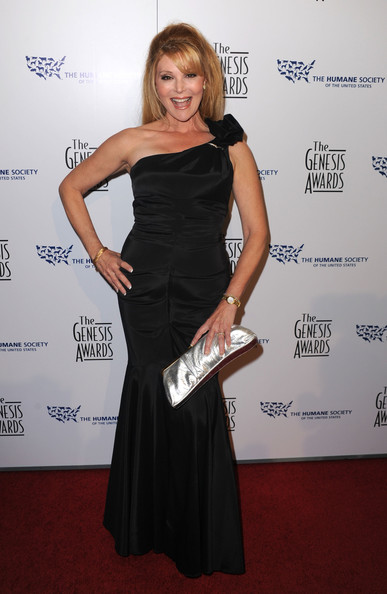
- Landers at the 24th Annual Genesis Awards in 2010
- Born: July 18, 1956 (age 70); Philadelphia, Pennsylvania, U.S.
- Education: Columbia University (BA)
- Occupations: Actress; singer; writer; producer
- Years active: 1971–present
- Spouse: Donald Berkowitz (m. 1988)
- Children: 2
- Mother: Ruth Landers
- Relatives: Judy Landers (sister)
- Website: audrey-landers.com

Audrey Landers (born July 18, 1956) is an American actress and singer, best known for her role as Afton Cooper on the television series Dallas and her role as Val Clarke in the film version of A Chorus Line (1985).

== Early years ==
Landers was born in Philadelphia, Pennsylvania. She graduated from Ramapo High School in 1976, attended Juilliard School to study music, and graduated from Columbia University with a bachelor of arts degree in psychology.

== Career ==
Before joining Dallas, she guest-starred in numerous television series, including The Dukes of Hazzard, Fantasy Island, The Love Boat and Battlestar Galactica and appeared as a panelist on Match Game in 1979 and on Match Game-Hollywood Squares Hour in 1983–84. In the 1990s, she appeared in the television miniseries of Jackie Collins' Lucky Chances. From 1990 to 1992, she played the role of Charlotte Hesser, eldest daughter of upstate Pennsylvania mob boss Carlo Hesser on the ABC daytime series One Life to Live.

After she left Dallas in 1984, she was cast by director Richard Attenborough as Val Clarke in the film version of A Chorus Line (1985). In 2013, she reprised her role of Afton Cooper in several episodes of the second season of the revival of Dallas.

With her young sons as inspiration, Landers created the children's television series, The Huggabug Club in 1996, for which, in addition to writing the scripts, she also wrote the 250+ original songs in the series. Her partner (and mother), Ruth Landers, produced the series and donated it to Public Television for its five-year run.

In 2006, she co-wrote, and co-directed the family adventure film, Circus Island, a Ruth Landers production. Landers and her mother have also created a fashion line called Landers STAR Collection which is gaining global popularity through QVC UK, and in Italy, Canada, Germany, and the U.S.

== Personal life ==
Audrey is sister of actress Judy Landers, and has acted with her in several roles, including multiple episodes of The Love Boat and The Hitchhiker episode "Split Decision", as well as Circus Island and Ghost Writer, films produced by Ruth Landers. Audrey and Judy Landers were on the cover and in a non-nude pictorial of the January 1983 issue of Playboy.

Landers married businessman Donald Berkowitz in May 1988. They have twin sons, Adam and Daniel, born in 1993.

== Selected filmography ==
Film and Television
Year	Title	Role	Notes
1972–1973	The Secret Storm	Joanna Morrison Landers #1	
1973	Search for Tomorrow	Connie	
1973	Room 222	Donna	1 episode
1973	Marcus Welby, M.D.	Tracy Robbins	1 episode
1973	The F.B.I.	Janine Winchell	1 episode
1973	Emergency!	Marsha	1 episode
1974–1976	Somerset	Heather Lawrence	
1975	One Flew Over the Cuckoo's Nest	Actress On TV Screen (Uncredited)	
1977	Happy Days	Kitty	1 episode
1977	Police Woman	Nancy	1 episode
1978	The Waverly Wonders	Ginger	1 episode
1978	Battlestar Galactica	Miri	1 episode
1979	Charlie's Angels	Donna Rossitter	1 episode
1979	Highcliffe Manor	Wendy Sparkles	5 episodes
1979	B.J. and the Bear	Carol Cain	1 episode
1979	Young Maverick	Sara Lou Mullen	1 episode
1979	1941	USO Girl	
1979–1984	Fantasy Island	Various roles	5 episodes
1980–1984	The Dukes of Hazzard	Billie Jean/Gail Flatt	2 episodes
1981	Underground Aces	Annie Wenders	
1981–1984, 1989	Dallas	Afton Cooper	84 episodes
1982	Tennessee Stallion	Charlotte	
1982–1985	The Love Boat	Various roles	4 episodes
1983	The Hitchhiker	Priscilla Packard	1 episode
1983	Tom Jones Now!	Herself	1 episode
1985	A Chorus Line	Val Clarke	
1986	Popeye Doyle	Jill Anneyard	
1986	Crazy Like a Fox	Dianne Bennett	1 episode
1986	Getting Even	Paige Starson	
1986	Popeye Doyle	Jill Anneyard	
1987	Johann Strauss: The King Without a Crown	Angelika Dittrich	
1989	Midnight Caller	Marie Devoe/Sandra	1 episode
1989	MacGyver	Carla Yeats / Roxy Yeats	1 episode
1989	Ghost Writer	Angela Reid	
1990	Lucky Chances	Marabelle	TV miniseries
1990–1991	One Life to Live	Charlotte Hesser	39 episodes
1991	California Casanova	JB	
1991	The Cosby Show	Cookie Bennett	1 episode
1992	Silk Stalkings	Liza Gutierrez	1 episode
1993	Lois & Clark: The New Adventures of Superman	Toots	1 episode
1994	Burke's Law	Dancer	1 episode
1995–1997	The Huggabug Club	Miss Audrey	47 episodes
1986, 1996	Murder, She Wrote	Greta Bayer/Phyllis Walters	2 episodes
1996	Dallas: J.R. Returns	Afton Cooper	
2006	Circus Camp	Lena Anderson	
2007–2008	Burn Notice	Veronica	4 episodes
2008	Bachelor Party 2: The Last Temptation	Bettina	
2011	Jackie Goldberg: Private Dick	Nadia	
2013–2014	Dallas	Afton Cooper	2 episodes
2018	Love at Sea	Maeve Grayham	Hallmark film
2018	Murder at the Mansion	Ivy	
2018	The 5th Borough	Dr. Bashin	

== Discography ==
Albums

- 1983 Little River
- 1984 Holiday Dreams (European release)/Wo der Südwind weht (Germany release)
- 1985 Paradise Generation
- 1986 Country Dreams (European release)/Weites Land (Germany release)
- 1988 Secrets
- 1990 My Dreams For You (European release)/Meine Träume für dich (Germany release)
- 1991 Rendez-Vous
- 1991 Das Audrey Landers Weihnachtsalbum
- 2005 Spuren eines Sommers
- 2006 Dolce Vita
- 2010: Spuren Deiner Zärtlichkeit
- 2013 Dallas feels like home

Singles

- 1978 Apple Don't Fall Far From the Tree
- 1979 You Thrill Me
- 1983 Manuel Goodbye
- 1983 Little River
- 1983 Playa Blanca
- 1984 Mi Amor (Duet with Camilo Sesto)
- 1984 Honeymoon In Trinidad
- 1985 Paradise Generation
- 1985 Jim, Jeff & Johnny
- 1985 Lucky
- 1985 "Reunited" (Duet with Tom Jones)
- 1985 Summernight In Rome
- 1986 These Silver Wings
- 1986 Yellow Rose of Texas
- 1986 Tennessee Nights
- 1987 Bella Italia
- 1988 Silverbird
- 1988 Never Wanna Dance (When I'm Blue)
- 1989 Gone With the Wind
- 1989 Sun of Jamaica
- 1990 Shine a Light
- 1990 Shadows of Love
- 1991 Santa Maria Goodbye
- 1991 Monte Carlo
- 1997 Heute habe ich an dich gedacht (with Bernhard Brink)
- 2004 Weil wir alle die gleiche Sonne sehen (with son Daniel)
- 2005 Sommernacht am Lago Maggiore
- 2006 In deinen Augen lag Dolce Vita
- 2007 Sommertraum
- 2009 "Weihnachten" (Christmas Time)
- 2009: Sommer, Meer und Sonnenschein
- 2010 "One Star" (Ein Stern)
- 2011 "Haïti Chérie"
- 2011 "Remember Yesterday" (An Jenem Tag)

== Charts ==
=== Albums ===
Year	Album	D	AUT	CH	NZ	SWE
1983	Little River	—	—	—	4	19
1984	Wo der Südwind weht	4	13	12	—	—
1985	Paradise Generation	52	—	14	—	—
1986	Weites Land	16	—	—	—	—

=== Singles ===
Year	Single	DE	AUS	AUT	CH	NZ	BE	NL	SA
1983	Manuel Goodbye	10	90	—	4	3	1	4	1
1983	Little River	28	—	6	15	—	34	38	—
1983	Playa Blanca	38	—	—	—	47	6	3	—
1984	Honeymoon in Trinidad	—	—	—	—	—	25	—	—
1984	Mi Amor	52	—	—	—	—	22	26	—
1985	Summernight In Rome	—	—	—	—	—	—	—	10
1988	Silver Bird	—	—	—	—	—	—	—	—
1997	Heute habe ich an dich gedacht	100	—	—	—	—	—	—	—
