= Suzy Gorman =

American photographer

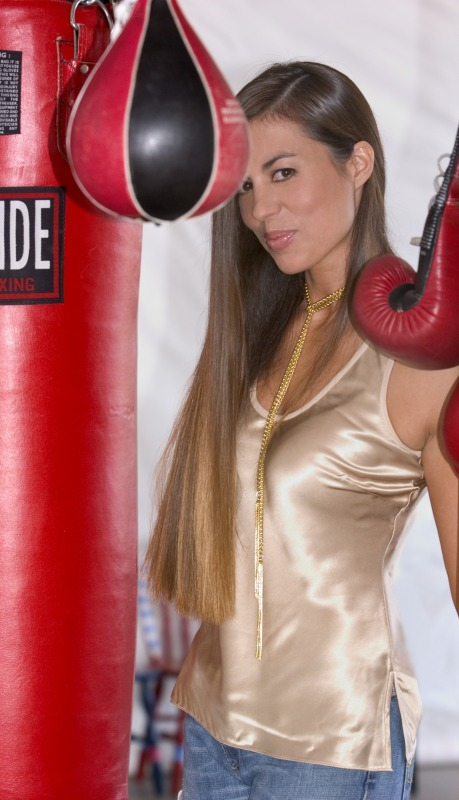
Suzy Gorman, 2006 Photography: Rick Gould

Suzanne Gorman (born June 8, 1962) is an American photographer based in St. Louis. Her client list includes former President Bill Clinton, former First Ladies Barbara Bush and Hillary Clinton, and sports and entertainment personalities such as Nelly, Cory Spinks, Bob Costas, Ozzie Smith, Jackie Joyner, Stephanie Patton, and Kathryn Sansone. She has also photographed Cirque du Soleil and hip-hop and musical artists such as Destiny's Child and Sting.

== Biography ==
Gorman was born in St. Louis in 1962. Her father Charles David Gorman was a professor of mathematics and her mother Gong Shu a psychodrama therapist.

Gorman attended University City High School, graduated at the age of 16, and then enrolled in Fontbonne College, receiving a degree in fine arts in 1983. Her interest in photography did not start until college, when she inherited her father's Leica camera after he died, at which point she took her first ever photography class. In 1981 she worked for St. Louis Mayor Vincent C. Schoemehl, and in 1982 she became an intern for Rick Gould, a local fashion photographer.

She cites Richard Avedon as one of her major influences and respects the work of Annie Leibovitz.

== Reception ==
The St. Louis Post Dispatch in 1995 started its article about Gorman with, "Suzy Gorman looks tough, talks gruff and acts rough. Is it shtick or is it Suzy?" and concludes that "it" is in fact Suzy. She is known for dismissing clients, instructing them to lose weight, and she is equally direct about telling people to change everything from their hair to their teeth.
