= Science International =

Canadian television series

- Also known as: What Will They Think of Next!
- Created by: Michael Spivak
- Directed by: David Langer
- Starring: Joseph Campanella; Tiiu Leek; Kerrie Keane
- Composer: Michael Spivak
- Country of origin: Canada
- Original language: English

Production
- Producer: Michael Spivak
- Running time: 30 minutes
- Production companies: Jaylar Productions "in association with The Universe"

Original release
- Network: Global
- Release: September 1976 – 1979

Science International, later retitled What Will They Think of Next!, is a Canadian television series produced by the Global Television Network from 1976 to 1979. Each episode featured approximately 20 short segments on scientific developments and trivia, narrated by Joseph Campanella and Tiiu Leek for its initial seasons. Kerrie Keane replaced Leek later in the series run. The hosts also appeared on camera, usually with chromakey effects behind them such as animation. The format of the series alternated between filmed footage of new inventions and developments and limited-animation segments usually focusing on more off-beat developments. After the show was retitled for its second and third seasons, Campanella proclaimed at the end of the opening credits that the reports originated from the "Research Unit of Science International."

In the US, this series aired in the early-1980s on Nickelodeon, with almost all episodes airing under the What Will They Think of Next! title; however, Nickelodeon did air some episodes under the Science International title.
