= Elemore Morgan Jr. =

American painter (1931–2008)

- Born: August 6, 1931; Baton Rouge, Louisiana, U.S.
- Died: May 18, 2008 (aged 76); Baltimore, Maryland, U.S.
- Education: Ruskin School of Art, New Orleans School of Art
- Alma mater: Louisiana State University
- Known for: en plein air painting
- Father: Elemore Morgan Sr.

Elemore Morgan Jr. (August 6, 1931 – May 18, 2008) was an American painter, photographer, and educator. He was recognized in the Southern United States as a leading contemporary landscape artist. He was a professor of art at University of Louisiana at Lafayette, from 1965 until 1998. His paintings of rice farms in Vermilion Parish have been widely exhibited, from Paris to Los Angeles.

== Life ==
Elemore Morgan Jr. was born on August 6, 1931, in Baton Rouge, Louisiana, he was an only child, and he was raised on his grandfather's farm. His upbringing shaped his affinity for nature and the rural life in Louisiana. His father Elemore Morgan Sr. influenced his decision to become an artist. His father was a full-time photographer, had also worked and farmed with Louisiana architect A. Hays Town.

At Louisiana State University and studied art, under the tutelage of Caroline Durieux, Ralston Crawford, and David LeDoux.

For two years he served in the United States Air Force as a supply officer during the Korean War. With the help of the GI Bill, Morgan studied art at the Ruskin School of Art at the University of Oxford in England. In 1959 he returned to Louisiana, renting a second-floor apartment in Lafayette, one flight up from author John Kennedy Toole. In Lafayette, Morgan began working with longtime friend and architect Neil Nehrbass.

== Work ==
He served as an associate professor from 1965 to 1998 at the University of Louisiana at Lafayette (then named the University of Southwestern Louisiana).

Morgan was renowned for his en plein air landscape paintings often in the heart of the rice growing region of southwest Louisiana. Many of Morgan’s landscapes were acrylic on oddly shaped Masonite panels, cut to fit his vision of the land, which he felt were integral to the design and composition of his works.

Morgan mused that his sense of nature affected his subject: "If you have more nature and less man, it’s going to have a certain effect on you. If you live in the city and you hardly see the sky, you’re going to think different. From growing up on that family farm and getting a real strong dose of nature, I need it to function. I also find that I’m in much better shape mentally if I’m out in nature on a regular basis."

Morgan's paintings and drawings were featured in "Where Land Meets Sky," an exhibit at the Paul and Lulu Hilliard University Art Museum, The University of Louisiana at Lafayette. The exhibit combined his works with the poetry of Darrell Bourque. It ran May 28-July 31, 1999. A book published on the exhibit includes an essay by Dr. Steven Bradley.

In 2007, Louisiana artist Brian Guidry traveled with Morgan to New York City to help facilitate Morgan’s America series.

Morgan received the Distinguished Artist award by the Delgado Society, of the New Orleans Museum of Art (2000); was named in Outstanding Achievement in the Arts award by the Acadiana Arts Council (1990); and Outstanding Undergraduate Teaching award by the Amoco Foundation (1984–1985).

== Death and legacy ==
Elemore Morgan died on May 18, 2008, after a complicated heart surgery at the University of Maryland Medical Center in Baltimore, Maryland.

In 2010, the state of Louisiana declared September 18 as "Elemore Morgan Day".

== Publications ==
Morgan contributed photography for a book titled, Makers of Cajun Music: Musiciens Cadiens Et Creoles (1984), written by Cajun folklorist Barry Jean Ancelet.

- Ancelet, Barry (1984). Makers of Cajun Music: Musiciens Cadiens Et Creoles. Elemore Morgan (photography) (1 ed.). University of Texas Press. ISBN 978-0292750791.

== See also ==
- List of Cajuns
