= Lance Kinsey =

Canadian actor and screenwriter

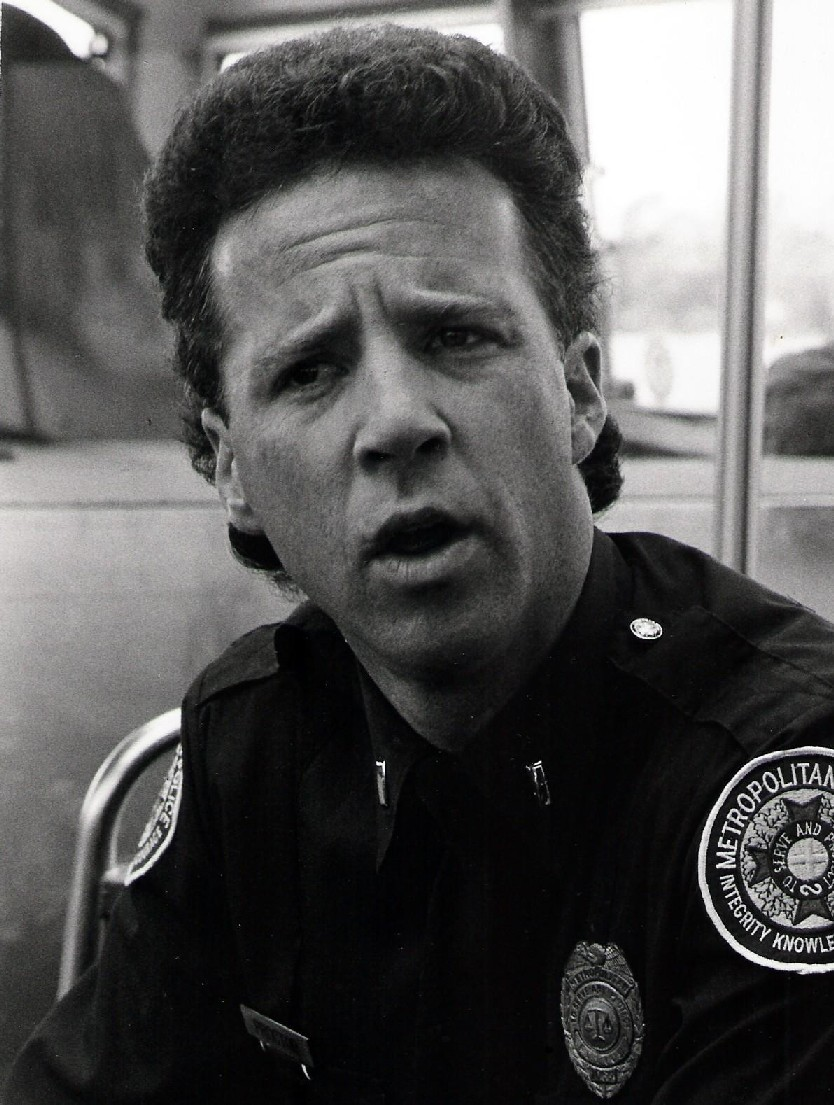
- Lance Kinsey in Sweden on a promotion tour for Police Academy 6: City Under Siege in June 1989.
- Born: June 13, 1954 (age 72); Calgary, Alberta, Canada
- Occupations: Actor, screenwriter
- Years active: 1979-present

Lance Kinsey (born June 13, 1954) is a Canadian actor and screenwriter, best known for his role as Lt. Proctor in the Police Academy film series. He also played the male lead in Club Fed and wrote for the Disney animated series, The Weekenders.

== Life and career ==
Kinsey was born in Calgary, Alberta, Canada, and grew up in Chagrin Falls, Ohio. He attended Hawken School in Gates Mills, Ohio and graduated from Vanderbilt University in Nashville, Tennessee. He majored in drama and after college apprenticed at Actors Theatre of Louisville. Then he performed with other regional theatres, dinner theatres and national touring companies.

Kinsey moved to Chicago and joined the Second City comedy troupe where he wrote and starred in several consecutive revues. He taught improv at high schools and colleges including Columbia College in Illinois as well as the Goodman Theatre. He was nominated for two Joseph Jefferson Awards.

Kinsey has appeared in television, film, and theatre productions, but is probably best known to audiences as Proctor, the brown-nosing, yes-man sidekick of Commandant Mauser and Captain Harris in the Police Academy film series. Kinsey also writes and produces for television and film. He appeared in one episode of The Amanda Show in 1999.

== Personal life ==
Kinsey is married, his wife is Nancy, they met in Chicago at Second City. They have a son, Matt, and daughter, Logan. They live in Los Angeles, California.

== Filmography ==
Year	Title	Role	Notes
1979	The Duke	Billy-Mike	Episode: "Nothin' Cept Noise"
1982	Things Are Tough All Over	Plastic Surgeon	
1983	Doctor Detroit	Street Dude	
1983	Class	Dog Trainer / Bar Patron	
1983	Remington Steele	Wesley Poone	Episode: "Love Among the Steele"
1985	Police Academy 2: Their First Assignment	Sgt. Proctor	
1986	Police Academy 3: Back in Training	Capt. Proctor	
1987	Easy Street	Perry	Episode: "The Check Is in the Mail"
1987	Police Academy 4: Citizens on Patrol	Lt. Proctor	
1988	Police Academy 5: Assignment Miami Beach	Lt. Proctor	
1988	Portrait of a White Marriage	Staffer #2	
1989	Police Academy 6: City Under Siege	Lt. Proctor	
1989	Wedding Band	Ritchie	
1990	Why Me?	Phone Technician	
1990	Club Fed	Howard Polk	
1990	Masters of Menace	Wallace Wolfby	
1992	Hero	Paramedic	
1993	Loaded Weapon 1	Irv	
1994	The Silence of the Hams	Interrogating Officer	
1998	Krippendorf's Tribe	Principal Reese	
2000	Twice in a Lifetime	Ron Taylor / Handy Randy	Episode: "Pride and Prejudice"
2001	Family Law	Sean Garland	Episode: "Irreparable Harm"
2002	Naked Movie	Himself	
2003	Dreamcatcher	Hofferman	Uncredited
2003	Sue Thomas: F.B.Eye	Kenneth Monroe	Episode: "Missing"
2004	Doc	Dave Thomas	Episode: "Eminent Domain"
2012	BuzzKill	Dennis	
2014	X-Men: Days of Future Past	Pentagon Security	Uncredited
2014	All Stars	Lance Grayden	Also director, writer, producer
2015	Come Simi	Dickie	
2018	Spare Room	Walt	
2024	Paper Bag Plan	Oscar	
2025	Platonic	Uncle Pete	Episode: "The Engagement Party"
