= Caroline Durieux =

American printmaker and painter (1896–1989)

Caroline Wogan Durieux
- Born: Caroline Spelman Wogan; January 22, 1896; New Orleans, Louisiana, U.S.
- Died: November 26, 1989; Baton Rouge, Louisiana, U.S.
- Education: National Autonomous University of Mexico; H. Sophie Newcomb College of Tulane University; Pennsylvania Academy of the Fine Arts
- Occupations: Artist, professor
- Years active: 1900–1989
- Known for: printmaking, painting, teaching
- Spouse: Pierre Durieux (m. 1920–1949; death)
- Awards: Women's Caucus for Art Lifetime Achievement Award (1980)

Caroline Wogan Durieux (January 22, 1896 – November 26, 1989) was an American printmaker, painter, and educator. She was a Professor Emeritus at both Louisiana State University, where she worked from 1943 to 1964 and at Newcomb College of Tulane University (1937–1942).

== Early life and education ==
Durieux was born Caroline Spelman Wogan in New Orleans, Louisiana, on January 22, 1896; into a Creole family.

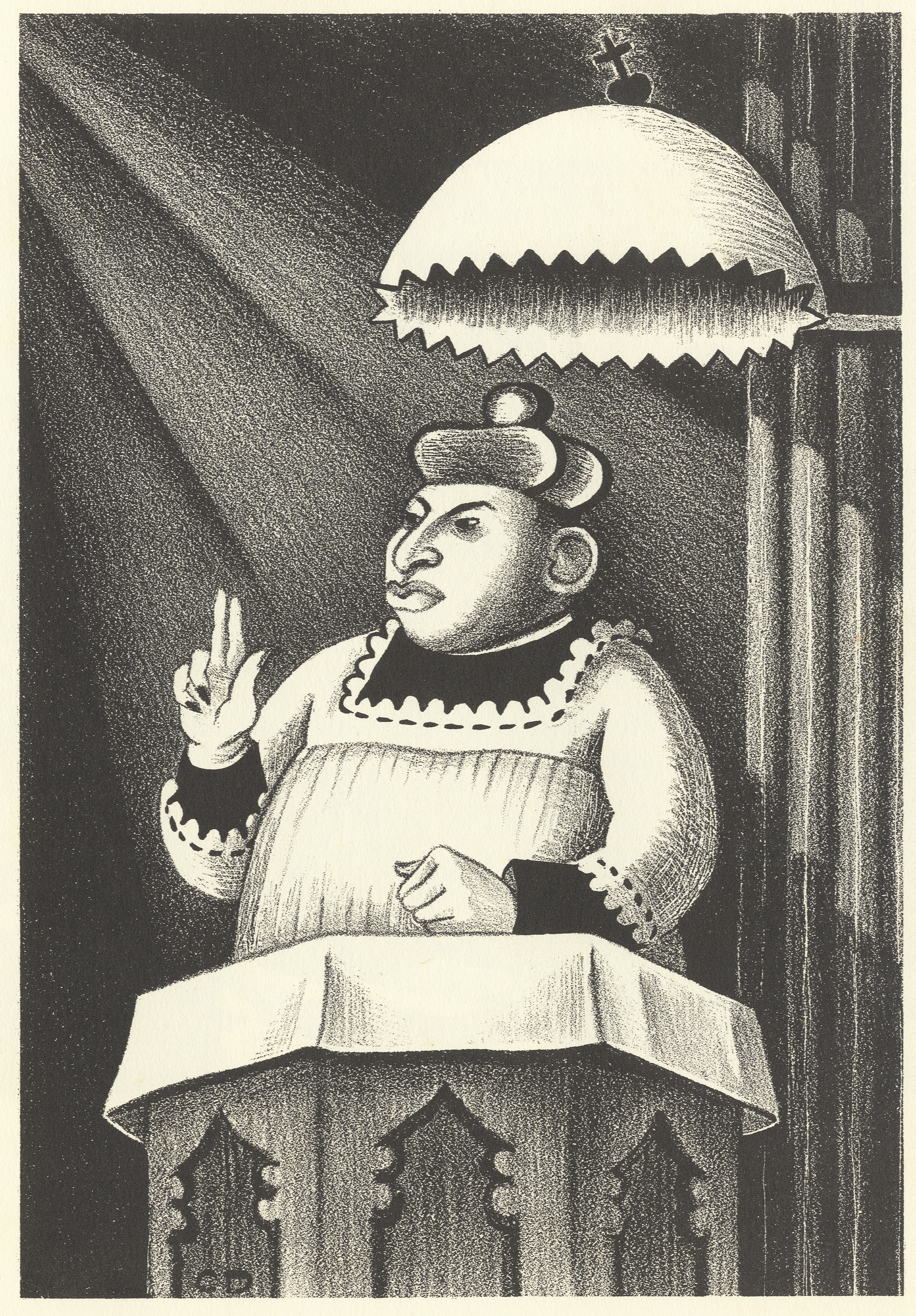
Benediction by Caroline Durieux

Durieux's father's family was Roman Catholic and her mother's were Episcopalian. According to Durieux, her father was shunned by some Catholics in his life for his marriage to her mother. As a child, Durieux went to both Protestant services and Catholic mass.

At the age of 4, she began drawing and received art lessons from Mary Williams Butler (1873–1937), who was a local artist and a member of the faculty of art at Newcomb College at Tulane University. She worked in watercolor from the age of six and at the age of 12 created a portfolio of ten watercolors depicting New Orleans scenery. Most of these early works are now in The Historic New Orleans Collection. She continued at Newcomb College of Tulane University in the Art School headed by Ellsworth Woodward. From her college days, she was interested in satire and the use of humor in her imagery. Durieux earned a Bachelor's in Design in 1916 and a Bachelor's in Art Education in 1917, and she pursued graduate studies at the Pennsylvania Academy of the Fine Arts led by Henry Bainbridge McCarter.

== Career ==
Her husband Pierre's work led to a job in Cuba, which Caroline described as a time of "quiet artistic growth that heightened her sense of color." Caroline Durieux lived in the French Quarter in the mid-1920s, and was part of a circle of talented and creative individuals featured in a private publication, "Sherwood Anderson and Other Famous Creoles." Her next-door neighbors included author William Faulkner and silver designer, William Spratling.

=== Durieux in Cuba (1920-1926) ===
On April 19, 1920, she married childhood friend Pierre Durieux at her parents' home at 1226 Louisiana Avenue in New Orleans. Pierre worked in his family's business importing laces and dress goods from many Latin American countries. In October 1920, the Durieux's moved to Havana, Cuba, where Pierre took a position with General Motors.

In late December 1920, Caroline Durieux returned to New Orleans to give birth to the couple's first and only child, Charles Logan Durieux. She spends the next six months recuperating from postpartum complications at her parents' vacation home in Bay St. Louis, Mississippi. When she returned to Cuba she and Pierre lived in the downtime neighborhood of Vedado. She worked briefly in a design firm but spent most of her time creating paintings, drawings and watercolors of her colorful surroundings. She has said color, and most of her work from this period were still lifes, flowers and landscapes.

At the request of her housekeeper, she became involved with the native women in the community, helping them devise a rudimentary method of birth control.

=== Mexico City (1926–1929) ===
In 1926, her husband Pierre was named chief representative of General Motors for all of Latin America, but Caroline stayed and worked in Mexico City. She received a letter of introduction to Diego Rivera from Tulane anthropologist, Frans Blom, which helped ease her transition into the local artist community.

Durieux not only befriended many of Mexico's leading artists and intellectuals of the day (including Rivera and Frida Kahlo) but flourished under the tutelage of Rivera and Emilio Amero with whom she honed her skills as a painter and printmaker as well as the satirical qualities of her work. In 1929, curator René d'Harnoncourt, organized a solo exhibition of Caroline's oil paintings and drawings at the Sonora News Company in Mexico City."

Rivera published an enthusiastic review in the journal Mexican Folkways:

"Since she has lived among us, she has developed a close spiritual rapport with the country and simultaneously there has grown in her a painter's mature power of expression. Not only does her painting show the love of nature, exalting the grandeur of the mountains, the beauty of the peasants, and the orderly freedom of our architecture, but she has also seen our mongrel, perverted and deformed bourgeoisie, with the clear eye of a Mexican mountaineer, and yet with all the urbanity, the culture, and the occidental sophistication which are Caroline's".

Durieux and Rivera's friendship is perhaps best celebrated in the elegant portrait the Mexican artist painted of his New Orleans comrade in 1929, and which today hangs in the collection of the LSU Museum of Art in Baton Rouge.

=== New York & Carl Zigrosser (1929–1931) ===
After 1929, a promotion for Pierre marked an important development in his wife's career; This time they moved to New York City, where Caroline forged a lifelong friendship with art dealer, Carl Zigrosser. Zigrosser championed Durieux's career, first as director of the Weyhe Gallery, then as the curator of prints at the Philadelphia Museum of Art and including her in his many books. It was Zigrosser who recognized Durieux's talent and eye for satire and encouraged her adoption of lithography as a primary means of artistic expression.

In 1931, the Durieuxs again were transferred to Mexico City. Eager to learn more about lithography, Durieux enrolled in the Academy of San Carlos (now known as National Autonomous University of Mexico) to study with Emilio Amero. In 1934, Durieux experimented with etching, a technique she learned from Howard Cook. Caroline wrote to Carl Zigrosser: "All my etchings are harrowing. I think it is because the medium is such a precarious one-the least slip and all is lost. I can't be funny on a copper plate. I feel tragic the moment I think of doing an etching."

=== Return to New Orleans, Goodwill Ambassador, and Mardi Gras (1937-1950s) ===
In 1937, Pierre Durieux was diagnosed with severe cardiac disease. His doctors ordered him to return to the United States, so the couple left Mexico reluctantly and returned to New Orleans. Later that year, Durieux was hired to teach in Newcomb College's art department for the fall term, where she focussed on ensuring that her students could draw before advancing to other classes. In October 1937, Durieux exhibited her etching, Hunger, as a member of the Society of American Etchers (now known as the Society of American Graphic Artists). The exhibition, hosted at the Marcel Guiot Gallery, featured 50 members and artist. Durieux took on a second job as director of the Federal Art Project (FAP) of the Works Progress Administration in February 1939. In a state where racial segregation remained legal until the 1960s, Caroline's Louisiana division of the FAP was the only project not to practice discrimination. Caroline always expressed great pride in that accomplishment: "I had a feeling that an artist is an artist and it doesn't make any difference what color he or she is." Robert Armstrong Andrews, associate director of the national office, praised Durieux's work: "It is my observation that the people in Louisiana have more concern with the potentialities of the Negro and less for his limitations than the people of any other state."

In August 1940, President Franklin D. Roosevelt named Nelson A. Rockefeller to head the Office of the Coordinator of Inter-American Affairs (CIAA), a new federal agency whose main objective was to strengthen cultural and commercial relations between the U.S and Latin America, in particular Brazil, in order to route Axis influence and secure hemispheric solidarity. Rockefeller appointed Caroline Durieux to accompany an exhibition from the Museum of Modern Art to Buenos Aires, Montevideo and Rio. Having spent so much of her career in Cuba and Mexico, Durieux had the language skills and political connections necessary to understand the sensitivities of the target audience. She relayed her concerns back to DC that the promotional poster was too US-centric to be embraced widely, and that the accompanying catalog was “confusing” because works not being exhibited in a given city were illustrated prominently in the all-inclusive book.

From 1943 to 1964, she taught in the art department at Louisiana State University.

In 1948, Caroline Durieux collaborated with John McCrady and Ralph Wickiser on the book Mardi Gras Day, published by Henry Holt. Each artist contributed 10 artworks as illustrations for the book. Notably, the ten lithographs that Durieux contributed for this book are seen as less satirical than the rest of her work— When asked about this, Durieux claimed that Mardi Gras was inherently self-satirical and therefore she decided to present it as is.

Durieux was a fixture at the Mardi Gras Day open house hosted by Lyle Saxon in the St. Charles Hotel. Dressing in costume was a requisite for admission to the party and some of Durieux's images for the book were of attendees.

In the 1950s, Durieux experimented in printmaking; working on perfecting her electron printmaking technique (with radioactive ink) and she produced the first color cliché verre prints.

In 1976, Caroline Durieux was the first living artist to be honored with a retrospective of her work at The Historic New Orleans Collection.

In 1980, she was awarded the Women's Caucus for Art Lifetime Achievement Award.

=== Foreign Ateliers (early 1950s) ===
In the early fifties, Caroline took a sabbatical from her Louisiana State University job to study color lithography in Paris. During her leave, she traveled throughout Europe to France, Italy, Spain and England, but eventually went to study at the atelier (studio) of Edmund Desjobert (d. 1964) and Son in Paris.

At first Durieux had difficulty at the workshop because of her gender:

"When I walked in to begin my work, I was given the smallest, oldest stones they could find. At first I was furious, but I used them to make my first images and brought them back in. The master printer seemed to be surprised at my ability—and I was immediately given the best, heaviest limestone they had for my next pieces."

— Caroline W. Durieux

Not only did the director of the workshop notice Durieux's talent but also they were impressed with her ability to speak their language: "Since I speak French they taught me all kinds of little tricks that they wouldn't tell the other Americans in the group because they didn't like them since they didn't speak French."

She studied with Desjobert for three months in 1952 and again in 1957.

In this new medium of color lithography her work became increasingly abstract, and her satire more subtle and complex . Durieux's color lithographs are more thought-provoking and less whimsical. She said of her work at this time: "I wanted to be more emphatic, more essential. I gradually realized that what you LEAVE OUT is important."

Durieux's interest in death is evident in the sober and minimalist work: Insomnie (1957) (figure 121). The artist depicts a night time scene of a hilly cemetery which is filled to capacity with white crosses. A green area with white outlines marks each plot. Even in death, a lone skeleton cannot relax and sits awake gazing at the sky thick with stars. The idea came to Durieux when she saw an American military cemetery while riding a bus in southern Italy; she thought that everyone was asleep; "then it occurred to me that maybe one of them wasn't."

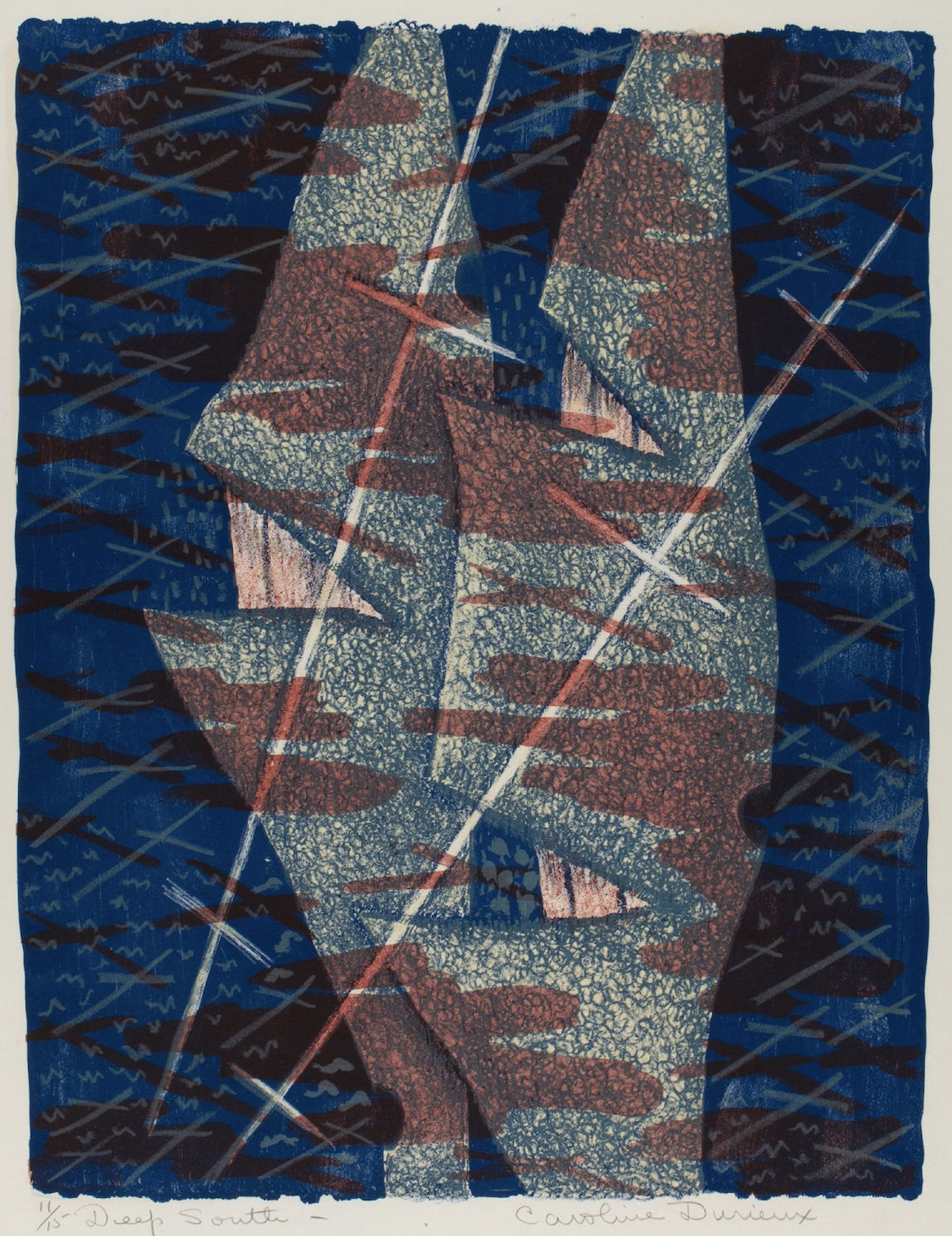
Deep South by Caroline Durieux (1957)

Durieux had a keen interest in the political climate at home and abroad. Activities of the Ku Klux Klan disturbed the artist as it did many other southerners; Deep South (1957) (figure 130) is a "take-off' on the KKK15 with its hooded figures and numerous fallen crosses and their ashes.

Durieux's choice of colors, red, white, blue and yellow is also ironic in its intent. Red, white and blue imply patriotism—an emotion which members of the Klan try to evoke their members. Durieux's inclusion of yellow adds a subtle dimension to the lithograph since the color is traditionally associated with cowardice.

Durieux's three trips to Paris were not all spent in the atelier of Desjobert. She also worked on color etching at Lacouriere-Frelaut which was founded in 1929. She worked with Roger Lacouriere—an engraver and printmaker whom Stanley William Hayter called "the most highly skilled artisans of color printing."

=== Electron Printmaking (1950s) ===
In 1951, Durieux began experimenting with ink-coated microbes with the help of student Natalie Wheeler and her husband, LSU botanist Harry Wheeler. In 1952, Durieux created the first electron print using radioactive ink. In his book The Appeal of Prints, Zigrosser hailed the technique as an advance in printmaking.

By 1954 Caroline introduced color into the electron printing process, with the assistance of friends on LSU’s Chemistry faculty, Dr. Olen Nance and Dr. John F. Christman. By 1957, Durieux applied for a patent on electron printing. That same year, she and Dr. Christman revived the 19th century technique cliché verre by using photographic paper in lieu of glass; Ultimately they devised a way to print color cliche verres using the new technique.

The new techniques were slow to be adopted because many were reluctant to work with the low level of radiation present; However, Durieux's experimental work was well received by critics and museums alike.

== Teaching and Mentoring ==
Caroline Durieux was a gifted teacher and devoted mentor for her students first at Newcomb College of Tulane University in New Orleans and then at Louisiana State University in Baton Rouge. In 1964 she retired as Professor Emeritus, but continued seeing and mentoring students at her home near campus until her stroke in 1980. Among her students are five that should be noted:

- George Dureau (1930–2014) was a photographer and painter who specialized in black-and-white nude photography of poor athletes, dwarfs and amputees many of whom were black. His photographs appeared before Robert Mapplethorpe became famous for his nude portraits; It is thought that Dureau's work inspired Mapplethorpe. Right-wing extremists' attacks on a Mapplethorpe exhibition helped elevate his profile. In contrast, the conservative high society mavens in New Orleans seemed to accept hanging Dureau's photographs of nude black men alongside their Audubons.
- Robert Gordy (1933–1986) is considered one of the most original and creative Southern painters of the twentieth century. He was known for his complex acrylic paintings that featured patterning and repetition, and linear shapes in a flat pictorial space in closely-keyed colors. A painter and printmaker, Gordy created a superb series of monotypes at the end of his life.
- Aris Koutroulis (1938–2013) grew up during World War II in Greece, surviving bombings and starvation that informed his artistic career. At Wayne State University, he was a cornerstone of the Printmaking Department where challenged his student's ideas of what art was, while allowing them to question their own personal art-making processes. In a Smithsonian oral history, Koutroulis stated:

"Caroline Durieux was fantastic – a major influence in my life. I learned from her not only about art but also about life. She was absolutely amazing in her way of life and her way of thinking, the clarity of her mind and her presence of knowing what is and what isn't, what's real and what is illusionistic. She realized my potential. She was responsible for my going to Tamarind. She wrote them "this is a person you should have"."

- Elmore Morgan, Jr. (1931–2008) was a painter of the southwest Louisiana prairie in the en plein air tradition, creating a monumental collection of iconic works that capture the vivid palette of that broad landscape under spacious skies. Morgan was also an accomplished photographer. From 1965 to 1998, Morgan taught painting and drawing at the University of Louisiana at Lafayette where he deeply influenced many contemporary Louisiana painters who studied or taught with him. Morgan was a student of Durieux's; later in his life, he began collecting her lithographs.
- Jesselyn Benson Zurik (1916–2012) created paintings, sculptures, and drawings throughout her life and exhibited them worldwide. She excelled in creating assemblages steeped in architectural and industrial patterns. She earned her Design degree from Sophie Newcomb College of Tulane University in 1938 where she studied with Caroline Durieux. She was a devotee of lifelong education and was generous in supporting artists, especially in the 1997 establishment of the Jesselyn Zurik Fund for Research at her alma mater, Newcomb College.

== Death and legacy ==
Durieux died on November 26, 1989, in Baton Rouge, Louisiana. Her papers are held at Louisiana State University and the Archives of American Art.

In 2010, a retrospective, "Caroline Durieux: A Radioactive Wit", was exhibited at the LSU Museum of Art. In 2018, she was profiled in a short film on New Orleans public TV, WYES, as part of the station's "Tricentennial Moments" campaign honoring the city.

Also in 2018, the Hermes Mardi Gras parade superkrewe included a float titled Caroline Durieux that was inspired by Swine Maskers, one of the titular artist's lithographs from the book Mardi Gras Day.

The largest collections of Durieux works may be seen in the following museums; the Philadelphia Museum of Art, the Historic New Orleans Collection, Louisiana State Museum, the Ogden Museum of Southern Art, LSU Museum of Art, Louisiana Art and Science Museum, and the Meridian Museum of Art.

== Bibliography ==
- Cox, Richard; Durieux, Caroline (1977). Caroline Durieux: Lithographs of the Thirties and Forties. Baton Rouge, Louisiana: Louisiana State University (LSU) Press. ISBN 9780807103722.
- Durieux, Caroline (2008). From Society to Socialism: The Art of Caroline Durieux, March 26 – June 15, 2008, Newcomb Art Gallery, Tulane University (exhibition). Newcomb Art Gallery. Newcomb Art Gallery, Tulane University. ISBN 9780966859560.
- Caroline Durieux and her Art Conquer Washington, A review of the artist's exhibition at the June 1 Gallery in Washington, DC, July 1979 June 1 Jottings
- Zigrosser, Carl. The Artist in America: Twenty-four Close-ups of Contemporary Printmakers. New York: A. A. Knopf, 1942.
