= Joseph Campanella =

American actor (1924–2018)

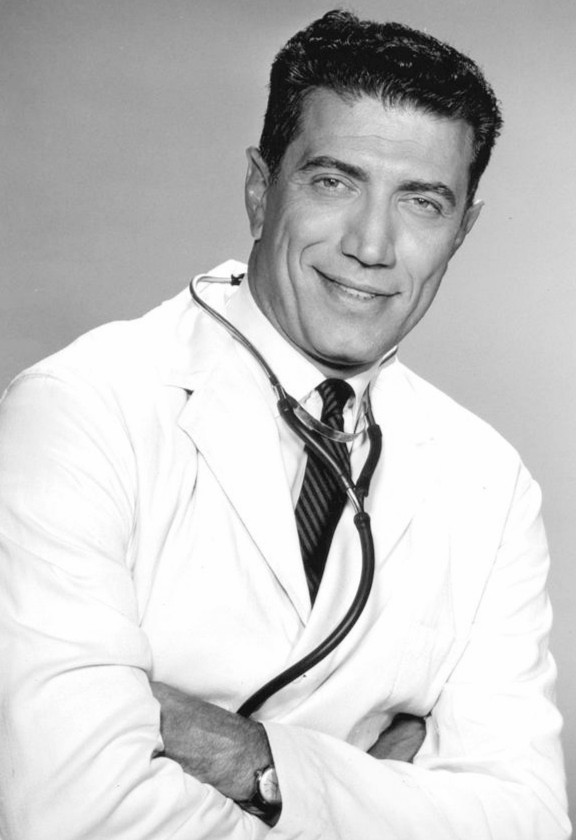
- Campanella in The Nurses, 1965
- Born: Joseph Anthony Campanella; November 21, 1924; Manhattan, New York, U.S.
- Died: May 16, 2018 (aged 93); Sherman Oaks, California, U.S.
- Education: Manhattan College; Columbia University
- Occupation: Actor
- Years active: 1952–2009
- Spouse: Kathryn Jill Bartholomew (m. 1964)
- Children: 7
- Relatives: Frank Campanella (brother)

Joseph Anthony Campanella (November 21, 1924 – May 16, 2018) was an American character actor. He appeared in more than 200 television and film roles from the early 1950s to 2009. Campanella was widely known for his roles as Joe Turino on Guiding Light from 1959 to 1962, Lew Wickersham on the detective series Mannix from 1967 to 1968, Brian Darrell on the legal drama The Bold Ones: The Lawyers from 1969 to 1972, Harper Deveraux on the soap opera Days of Our Lives from 1987 to 1992, co-host of Science International from 1976 to 1979, and his recurring role as Jonathan Young on The Bold and the Beautiful from 1996 to 2005.

He narrated the Discover science series on the Disney Channel from 1992 until 1994. Campanella voiced the character of Dr. Curt Connors/The Lizard on Spider-Man: The Animated Series (1994–1997).

Campanella was nominated for a Daytime and Primetime Emmy Award and a Tony Award throughout his career.

== Early life ==
Campanella was born in Manhattan, New York City to Sicilian immigrants Philip and Mary O. Campanella. His father was a pianist and his mother was a homemaker and dressmaker. He was the younger brother of actor Frank Campanella (1919–2006) and had another brother named Philip. The family lived in the Washington Heights neighborhood of Manhattan. He and his brothers grew up speaking Italian before learning English. The Campanella family was staunchly Catholic.

Campanella served in the United States Navy during World War II as a landing craft commander. At 18, he was one of the youngest commanders in the Navy, serving from 1944 to 1946. He later graduated from Manhattan College in 1948, and attended Columbia University, where he studied drama. Before starting his acting career, he worked as a radio sportscaster in Lewistown, Pennsylvania.

== Career ==
Campanella appeared in such television shows as Combat!, Decoy, The Eleventh Hour, The Doctors, The Fugitive, Mission: Impossible, Marcus Welby, M.D., Gunsmoke, The Big Valley, Alias Smith and Jones, A Man Called Ironside (pilot), The Untouchables, Police Story, The Road West, The Invaders, The Mary Tyler Moore Show, The Rockford Files, The Golden Girls, Mama's Family, Lois & Clark: The New Adventures of Superman and Baywatch.

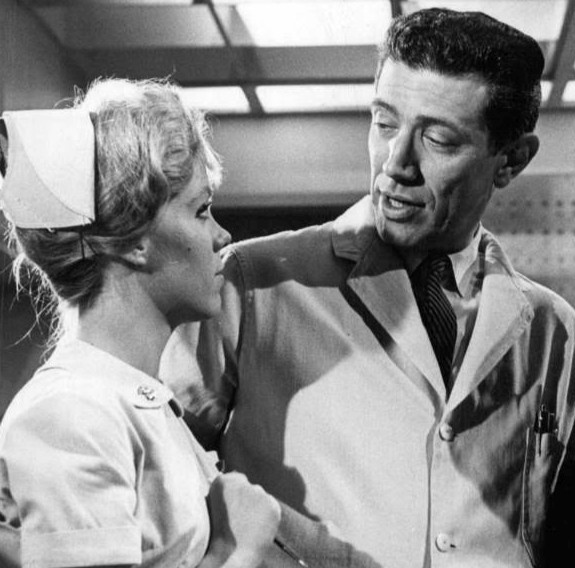
Campanella and Zina Bethune in a publicity photo for The Doctors and the Nurses (1965)

Campanella had a recurring role from 1959 to 1962 as a criminal named Joe Turino on the long-running CBS daytime drama Guiding Light. He had a recurring role as Dr. Ted Steffen on the medical drama The Doctors and the Nurses from 1964 to 1965. One of his most popular roles was as Lew Wickersham in season 1 (1967–1968) of the television series Mannix, serving as the head of the detective agency Joe Mannix (Mike Connors) worked for. He was let go from his role after the first season due to a reworking of the program's concept. He appeared as attorney Brian Darrell from 1969 to 1972 in The Bold Ones: The Lawyers. In 1973, he played an old flame of Mary Richards (Mary Tyler Moore) on The Mary Tyler Moore Show, the twenty-second episode of season 3, titled "Remembrance of Things Past". He played Los Angeles County Sheriff's Department Captain Monty Ballard in the crime drama television film Sky Hei$t in 1975.

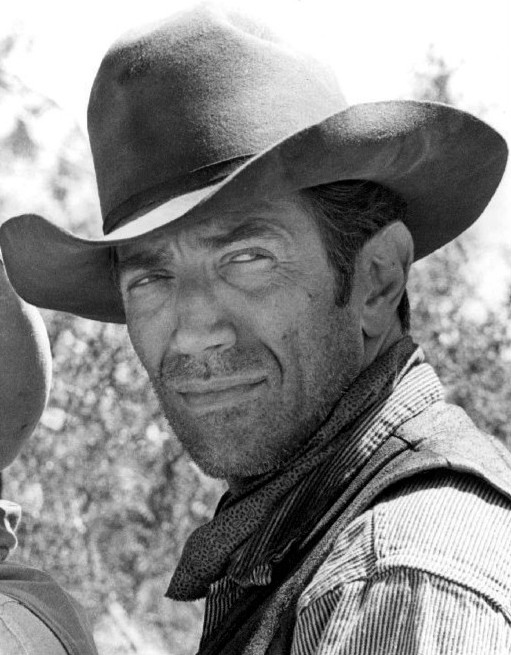
Campanella in a publicity photo for Gunsmoke (1968)

Campanella played Ann Romano's (Bonnie Franklin) ex-husband, Ed Cooper, in eight episodes of One Day at a Time (1975–1984) and Barbara Stanwyck's love interest in the first season (1985–1986) of Aaron Spelling's short-lived Dynasty spinoff, The Colbys. He appeared in a second-season episode of The Golden Girls as a detective. He had a prominent role as Harper Deveraux on the soap opera Days of Our Lives from 1987 to 1988, had a recurring role as a doctor in Beauty and the Beast (1989–1990), a recurring role as Jimmy Everett on General Hospital from 1991 to 1992, and a recurring role on The Bold and the Beautiful from 1996 to 2005.

Campanella hosted the Canadian educational program Science International between 1976 and 1979, which aired on Nickelodeon as What Will They Think of Next! He also appeared in the independent comedy, For Heaven's Sake.

On Broadway, Campanella was featured in three productions during the 1960s. His first, The Captains and the Kings, opened in January 1962 and lasted only seven performances. In February 1962, he was cast in A Gift of Time with film stars Henry Fonda and Olivia de Havilland. It was written and directed by Garson Kanin, and he received a Tony nomination as Best Featured Actor in a Play. His last Broadway performance was in the musical Hot Spot in 1963, which starred Judy Holliday. The show was not well received and delayed its opening four times, resulting in a run of 58 previews and 43 regular performances.

For a time Campanella provided the voice-over for BMW commercials in the United States, intoning, "BMW — the ultimate driving machine". For several years beginning in the 1970s, He was a spokesman for NAPA Auto Parts.

Campanella voiced the character of Dr. Curt Connors/The Lizard on Spider-Man: The Animated Series (1994–1997). He narrated the Discover science series on the Disney Channel from 1992 to 1994. His final film roles were that of Donald Meeks in For Heaven's Sake (2008) and in Lost Dream (2009) as Emil.

Throughout his career, Campanella was nominated for the Tony Award for Best Featured Actor in a Play for his work in A Gift of Time in 1962. In 1968, he was nominated for the Primetime Emmy Award for Outstanding Supporting Actor in a Drama Series for his role as Wickersham in Mannix. In 1989, Campanella was nominated for the Daytime Emmy Award for Outstanding Supporting Actor in a Drama Series for his role as Deveraux in Days of Our Lives.

== Personal life ==
Along with voice acting, Campanella was also a whistler. He whistled on The Brian Jonestown Massacre's song "You Look Great When I'm Fucked Up". His son Rob was in the band.

Campanella met his wife, Kathryn Jill Bartholomew, a singer and dancer, in 1963 while he was playing the leading man in Hot Spot on Broadway. They married on May 30, 1964, and had seven sons: Philip (b. 1965), Robert Yale (b. 1966), Joseph Anthony Jr. (b. 1967), Dominic Peter (b. 1969), Anthony F. (b. 1974), John Mario (b. 1977), Andrew Michael (b. 1979), and a stillborn daughter, Lucy Kathryn (b.d. 1981).

According to Campanella, their baby daughter's death "nearly destroyed" his wife, as she dearly wished for a little girl. He said his wife was inconsolable for weeks, blaming the hospital staff for the stillbirth, and locking herself in their bedroom, crying. The couple attempted to adopt a daughter, but were turned down.

Campanella died at the age of 93 on May 16, 2018, at his home in Sherman Oaks, California of complications from Parkinson's disease.

== Filmography ==
=== Film ===
Year	Title	Role	Notes
1960	Murder, Inc.	Panto	Uncredited
1964	The Young Lovers	Professor Reese	
1967	The St. Valentine's Day Massacre	Albert Wienshank	
1972	Silent Running	Neal, Berkshire Captain (voice)	Uncredited
1972	Ben	Cliff Kirtland	
1974	Child Under a Leaf	Gerald	
1977	Mission to Glory: A True Story	Father At San Bruno Mission	
1979	Meteor	General Easton	
1979	Adventures of the Polar Cubs	The Narrator/ Scholar Mu	Voice; English dub
1980	Defiance	Karenski	
1980	Hangar 18	Frank Lafferty	
1981	Earthbound	Conrad	
1983	Great Transport	German Major	
1987	Steele Justice	Harry	
1988	The Game	Schekel	
1990	No Retreat, No Surrender 3: Blood Brothers	John Alexander	
1990	Body Chemistry	Dr. Pritchard	
1990	Down the Drain	Don Santiago	
1990	A Show of Force	Walker Ryan	
1990	Club Fed	FBI Chief Vince Hooligan	
1991	Last Call	Morris Thayer	
1991	Cafe Romeo	Nino	
1992	Original Intent	Judge May	Direct-to-video
1992	Space Case	General Maxwell	
1992	Dead Girls Don't Tango	Rheinhardt	
1993	Magic Kid	Tony	Direct-to-video
1993	The Force Within	Police Chief	
1994	Save Me	Barton	
1994	Too Bad About Jack		
1995	Hologram Man	Dr. Stern	Direct-to-video
1996	The Glass Cage	LeBeque	
1997	James Dean: Race with Destiny	Winton Dean	
1997	Dust	Mayor Grites	
1998	The Right Way		
1999	Grizzly Adams and the Legend of Dark Mountain	Professor Hunnicut	
2006	The Showdown	The Announcer	Short film
2007	The Dukes	Giovanni Zorro	
2007	The Legend of God's Gun	The Narrator	
2008	For Heaven's Sake	Donald Meeks	
2009	Lost Dream	Emil	Final role

=== Television ===
Year	Title	Role	Notes
1952	Suspense	Townsman	2 episodes
1952–1955	Studio One	Police Sergeant Monahan / DOG Company Soldier	2 episodes
1955–1957	Robert Montgomery Presents	Tony	3 episodes
1956–1958	Kraft Television Theatre		3 episodes
1957	The United States Steel Hour	Jacques	Episode: "Haunted Harbor"
1958	Decoy	Sergeant	Episode: "My Brother's Killer"
1958	Omnibus		Episode: "Capital Punishment"
1959	Armstrong Circle Theatre		Episode: "The Man with a Thousand Names"
1959	New York Confidential	Ernie	Episode: "Incident at Fulton Market"
1959–1962	Guiding Light	Joe Turino	
1960	Startime	Repairman	Episode: "The Man"
1961–1962	Naked City	Dr. Rutland / Dutton / Detective Dutton	3 episodes
1962	Alcoa Premiere	Marc Malatesta	Episode: "The Hands of Danofrio"
1962	The Untouchables	Vince Dastille	Episode: "The Floyd Gibbons Story"
1962–1963	Route 66	Whit Spencer / Perry Hall	2 episodes
1962–1965	The Nurses	Dr. Ted Steffen / Dr. Adam Nemets	31 episodes
1963	The Doctors	Alec Fielding	Episode: "In Sickness and in Health"
1963	East Side/West Side	Chuck Severson	Episode: "No Hiding Place"
1963	Bob Hope Presents the Chrysler Theatre	Frank Mancini	Episode: "Corridor 400"
1963–1964	Combat!	Lieutenant Douglas / D'Amato	2 episodes
1963–1968	The Virginian	Walker / Corbett / Pedro Lopez	3 episodes
1964	Espionage	Ben Ashman	Episode: "We the Hunted"
1964	The Eleventh Hour	Pete Ceballos	Episode: "87 Different Kinds of Love"
1964	The Lieutenant	Major Jason Clark	Episode: "Lament for a Dead Goldbrick"
1964	Suspense	A Driver	Episode: "I, Buck Larsen"
1964–1967	The Fugitive	Captain Ralph Lee / Deputy Harry Banner / Jesse Stransel / Lieutenant Spencer	4 episodes
1965	For the People	Dr. Ted Steffen	Episode: "Act of Violence: Part 2"
1966	Shane	Barney Lucas	Episode: "Killer in the Valley"
1966	Twelve O'Clock High	Father Roman	Episode: "The Duel at Mont Sainte Marie"
1966	The Road West	Tom Burrus	Episode: "Power of Fear"
1966–1967	The Big Valley	Francisco De Navarre / Martinson	Episodes: "The Martyr", "Turn of a Card"
1966–1972	The F.B.I.	Ken Meade / John Anthony Harris / Fritz Moline	3 episodes
1967	Run for Your Life	Ward Cooper	Episode: "A Rage for Justice: Part 2"
1967	The Wild Wild West	Talamantes	Episode: "The Night of the Wolf"
1967	The Invaders	Father Joe Corelli	Episode: "Storm"
1967	Captain Nice	Kincade	Episode: "Beware of Hidden Prophets"
1967–1968	Mission: Impossible	Captain Miklos Cherno / Dr. Helmut Cherlotov	2 episodes
1967–1969	Insight	Mike / Irwin / Deliverer / Roger	4 episodes
1967–1972	Mannix	Lew Wickersham (co-starring role in Season 1); Dr. Graham Aspinall (Guest star in "The Crimson Halo" in Season 6)	25 episodes Nominated—Primetime Emmy Award for Outstanding Supporting Actor in a Drama Series (1968)
1968–1970	The Name of the Game	Ben Fisher / Charles Thorndyke	2 episodes
1968–1972	Gunsmoke	Jack Norcross / Amos McKee	2 episodes
1969	Any Second Now	Dr. Raul Valdez	Television film
1969	The Whole World Is Watching	Brian Darrell	Television film
1969	The Doris Day Show	Roger Flanders	Episode: "The Con Man"
1969	Lancer	Douglas Blessing	Episode: "Devil's Blessing"
1969–1972	The Bold Ones: The Lawyers	Brian Darrell	26 episodes
1969–1975	Ironside	Judge John Fredericks / Curtis Whitney / Harry Peters / Raymond Otis Baker	4 episodes
1970	Paris 7000	Alex Prokosch	Episode: "No Place to Hide"
1970	Bracken's World	Sampson Wilkes	Episode: "A Beginning, a Middle and an End"
1970	A Clear and Present Danger	Jordan Boyle	Television film
1970–1971	Marcus Welby, M.D.	Howard Garsen / Ignacio Ladera / Leo Maslow	3 episodes
1970–1971	Night Gallery	Father / Simms	2 episodes
1971	Alias Smith and Jones	Jake Carlson	Episode: "The 5th Victim"
1971	Murder Once Removed	Lieutenant Phil Proctor	Television film
1971	And Then They Forgot God	Arthur Thompson / Narrator	Television film
1971–1972	Owen Marshall, Counselor at Law	Alan Hamilton / Dr. Eric Gibson	2 episodes
1972	The Sixth Sense	Paul Crowley	Episode: "The Man Who Died at Three and Nine"
1973	The Mary Tyler Moore Show	Tom Vernon	Episode: "Remembrance of Things Past"
1973	You'll Never See Me Again	Lieutenant John Stillman	Television film
1973	Honor Thy Father	The Narrator	Voice, television film
1973	Assignment Vienna	Frank Cort	Episode: "Soldier of Fortune"
1973	Drive Hard, Drive Fast	Eric Bradley	Television film
1973	The Rookies	Joe Mannley	Episode: "Get Ryker"
1973	The President's Plane Is Missing	Colonel Doug Henderson	Television film
1973	The ABC Afternoon Playbreak		Episode: "The Things I Never Said"
1973–1975	Medical Center	Colson / Duncan	2 episodes
1974	Tenafly	Dr. Poston	Episode: "Man Running"
1974	The Magician	Frank Mitchell	Episode: "Shattered Image"
1974	Skyway to Death	Bob Parsons	Television film
1974	Unwed Father	Scott Simmons	Television film
1974	Police Story	Vitale	Episode: "The Gamble"
1974	Lily		Television film
1974	Petrocelli	Arthur Holbrook	Episode: "The Golden Cage"
1974	Terror on the 40th Floor	Howard Foster	Television film
1974	Hit Lady	Jeffrey Baine	Television film
1974	McCloud	Victor Rhigas	Episode: "The Concrete Jungle Caper"
1975	Khan!		Episode: "Mask of Deceit"
1975	Journey from Darkness	Dr. Schroeder	Television film
1975	Sky Heist	Captain Monty Ballard	Television film
1975	Barbary Coast	Austin Benedict	Episode: "Sauce for the Goose"
1975	Matt Helm	Corbett	Episode: "Death Rods"
1975	The People's Lawyer	The Announcer	Television film
1976	Police Woman	Joseph Carbeau	Episode: "Angela"
1976	The Rockford Files	Arnold Bailey	Episode: "In Hazard"
1976	Child Abuse	The Announcer	Television film
1976	Friday Night Burn	The Announcer	Television film
1976–1982	One Day at a Time	Ed Cooper	8 episodes
1976-1979	Science International / What Will They Think of Next?	The Narrator	Canadian science news show
1977–1982	Quincy, M.E.	Dr. Styer / Lieutenant Alex Markesian / Charlie Barnes / Attorney Jules Draper	4 episodes
1978	Fantasy Island	Brian Faber	Episode: "Return to Fantasy Island"
1978	Ring of Passion	Paul Gallico	Television film
1978	What Really Happened to the Class of '65?	Racklin	Episode: "The Misfit"
1978	Pearl	The Narrator	Television miniseries
1978	Greatest Heroes of the Bible	The Pharaoh	2 episodes
1978–1980	Vegas	Bruno Moretti / Stewy Wilson	2 episodes
1980	The Plutonium Incident	Harry Skirvan	Television film
1981	The Brady Brides	Inspector Rankin	Episode: "The Siege"
1981	Jessica Novak	Larry Baker	Episode: "The Boy Most Likely"
1981	Trapper John, M.D.	Dr. Julian King	Episode: "Future Imperfect"
1982	My Body, My Child	Joe Cabrezi	Television film
1982	The Comic Book Kids	Burl Bonnix	
1983	Matt Houston	Nick Harrigan	Episode: "A Novel Way to Die"
1983	This Is Your Life	Host	
1984	Airwolf	General Elliot Sandhower	Episode: "Firestorm"
1985	Hotel	Russ Turnbull	Episode: "Illusions"
1985–1986	The Colbys	Hutch Corrigan	8 episodes
1985–1987	Murder, She Wrote	George McDaniels / George Knapp	2 episodes
1986	Crazy Like a Fox	Bart Simian	Episode: "Hyde-And-Seek"
1986	The Love Boat	Nabil El Masri	2 episodes
1987	The Golden Girls	Al Mullins	Episode: "To Catch a Neighbor"
1987	Tales from the Hollywood Hills: Pat Hobby Teamed with Genius	Jack Berners	Television film
1987–1988	Mama's Family	Mr. Hanson	3 episodes
1987–1992	Days of Our Lives	Harper Deveraux	Nominated—Daytime Emmy Award for Outstanding Supporting Actor in a Drama Series (1989)
1988–1989	Dallas	Joseph Lombardi Sr.	3 episodes
1988–1989	Beauty and the Beast	Dr. Peter Alcott	3 episodes
1989	Reel to Real	The Narrator	
1989	21 Jump Street	Hunt Samperton	Episode: "The Dreaded Return of Russell Buckins"
1989	Superboy	The Phantom	Episode: "The Phantom of the Third Division"
1989–1991	Knots Landing	Deputy District Attorney / Judge Percal	3 episodes
1990	Paradise	The Horseman	Episode: "The Gates of Paradise"
1990	Over My Dead Body	Leon Geary	Episode: "Carrie Christmas and a Nappie New Year"
1991	The Everlasting Adventure Series		
1991	P.S. I Luv U	Dellacourt	Episode: "Diamonds Are a Girl's Worst Friend"
1991	Memories of Midnight	Father Konstantinou	Television film
1991–1992	General Hospital	Jimmy Everett	
1992	Terror on Track 9	Chief Mleczko	Television film
1992	Dark Justice	Carter Pruitt	Episode: "Happy Mothers Day"
1992	Pauper's Dream	The Narrator	Television film
1993	Baywatch	Al Buchannon	Episode: "A Matter of Life and Death"
1993	Batman: The Animated Series	Matthew Thorne / Crime Doctor	Voice, episode: "Paging the Crime Doctor"
1993	Lois & Clark: The New Adventures of Superman	George Thompson	Episode: "Strange Visitor (From Another Planet)"
1994	Renegade	Henry	Episode: "Carrick O'Quinn"
1994	The Rockford Files: I Still Love L.A.	Mickey Ryder	Television film
1994–1997	Spider-Man: The Animated Series	Dr. Curt Connors / Lizard	Voice, 20 episodes
1996	Walker, Texas Ranger	Victor DeMarco	Episode: "Rodeo"
1996	Charlie Grace		Episode: "I've Got a Secret"
1996–1997	Pacific Blue	Joseph Tataglia	3 episodes
1996–1997	Road Rovers	The Master / William Shepherd	Voice, main role (13 episodes)
1996–2005	The Bold and the Beautiful	Jonathan Young	97 episodes
1997	Touched by an Angel	Clive Hathaway	Episode: "Charades"
1997	L.A. Heat	John Guidell	Episode: "National Security"
1998–2001	The Practice	Judge Joseph Camp	5 episodes
1999	Early Edition	MacGruder	Episode: "The Last Untouchable"
1999	The Great Builders of Egypt	The Narrator	Television film
1999	Melrose Place	Barry Denott	3 episodes
1999	G vs E	Dr. Townsend	Episode: "Evilator"
2000	Who Is This Jesus?	The Narrator	Television film
2000–2001	That's Life	Joe	11 episodes
2001	Biography	Host	Episode: "Charles Darwin: Evolution's Voice"
2001	The Apostle Paul: The Man Who Turned the World Upside Down	St. Paul	Voice, television film
2001	Star Trek: Voyager	Federation Arbitrator	Episode: "Author, Author"
2002	The Division	Judge Miles King	Episode: "Brave New World"
2002	The Glow	Ben Goodstein	Television film
2003	The Guardian	Ralph Longo	Episode: "Let God Sort 'Em Out"
2004	Cold Case	Nelson	Episode: "Factory Girls"
2006	La Macchina Da Guerra Romana	The English Narrator	Three Part Mini-Series for The History Channel
2007	Christmas at Cadillac Jack's	Joe Jenkins	Television film
2008	CSI: Crime Scene Investigation	Grissley Geezer	Episode: "Bull"
