= David Paetkau =

Canadian actor

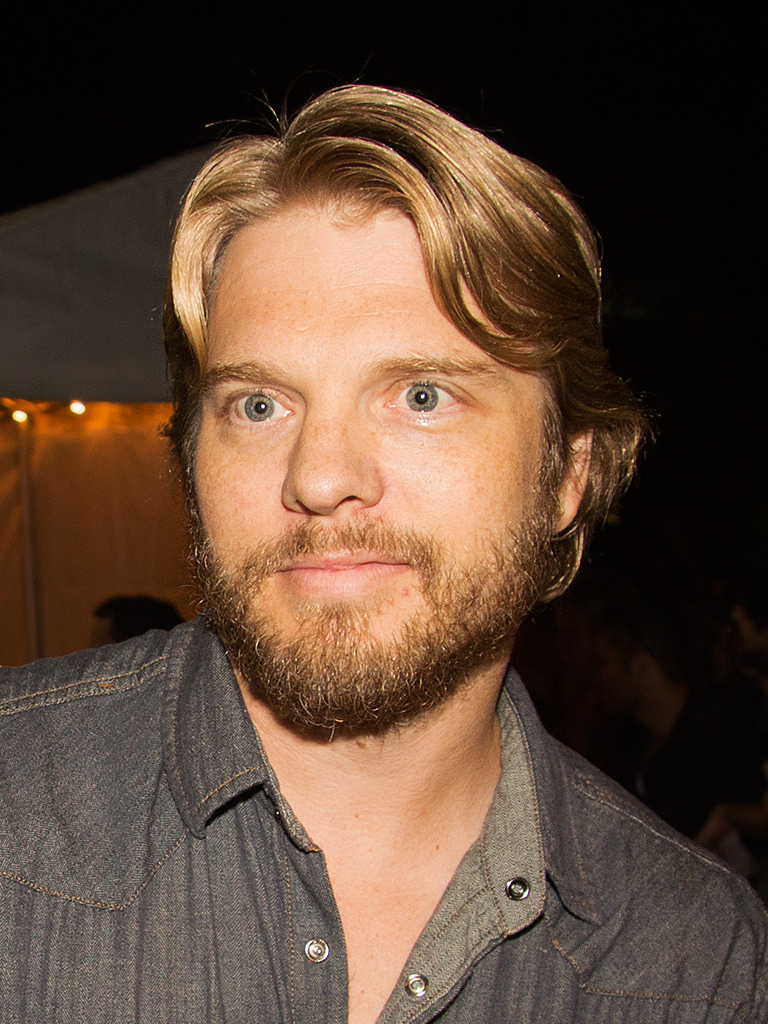
- Paetkau at the Toronto International Film Festival in 2014
- Born: 1972 or 1973 (age 52–53); Vancouver, British Columbia, Canada
- Occupation: Actor
- Years active: 1998–present
- Spouse: Evangeline Duy (m. 2009)
- Children: 2

David Paetkau (born 1972 or 1973) is a Canadian actor who has played Evan Lewis in Final Destination 2 (2003), Nick the customs officer in LAX (2004), Beck McKaye in Whistler (2006–2008), Ira Glatt in Goon (2011), and Sam Braddock in the CTV/CBS television series Flashpoint (2008–2012).

Paetkau has appeared in Aliens vs. Predator: Requiem, I'll Always Know What You Did Last Summer, So Weird (as Brent on the episode "Vampire"; May 20, 2000), For Heaven's Sake, and a one episode appearance on Dexter, as Lumen Pierce (Julia Stiles)'s fiancé, Owen. Paetkau has also lent his voice to Canadian commercials for Chevrolet automobiles.

== Personal life ==
David Paetkau is one of five children. A native of Vancouver, he grew up in Sechelt and is a supporter of his hometown NHL team, the Vancouver Canucks. He is married to Evangeline Duy. They have two children.

== Filmography ==
=== Film ===
Year	Title	Role	Notes
1998	Disturbing Behavior	Tom Cox	
2000	Snow Day	Chuck Wheeler	
2001	Candy from Strangers	David	Short film
2002	Slap Shot 2: Breaking the Ice	Gordie Miller	
2002	Bang Bang You're Dead	Brad Lynch	
2003	Final Destination 2	Evan Lewis	
2006	Becoming Bardo	Bardo	Short film
2006	I'll Always Know What You Did Last Summer	Colby Patterson	
2007	Aliens vs. Predator: Requiem	Dale Collins	
2008	For Heaven's Sake	Young David	
2011	Goon	Ira Glatt	
2013	Man of Steel	Threat Analyst	
2014	The Colossal Failure of the Modern Relationship	James	
2016	The Space Between	Marcus	
2017	Trap	Justin Tremblay	Short film
2017	Goon: Last of the Enforcers	Ira Glatt	

=== Television ===
Year	Title	Role	Notes
1998	The Crow: Stairway to Heaven	Kyle Barber	Episode: "Like It's 1999"
1998	Perfect Little Angels	Jeff	TV movie
1999	First Wave	Elias	Episode: "Playland"
2000	So Weird	Brent	Episode: "Vampire"
2000–2001	Just Deal	Hunter	11 episodes
2001–2009	Smallville	Trevor Chapell/Officer Danny Turpin	2 episodes
2002	Taken	Buzz	Episode: "Acid Tests"
2003	Stargate SG-1	Lyle Pender	Episode: "Forsaken"
2003	National Lampoon's Thanksgiving Family Reunion	Jimmy Hodges	TV movie
2004	American Dreams	Doc	2 episodes
2004	Cold Squad	Barry	Episode: "Teen Angel"
2004–2005	LAX	Nick	10 episodes
2005	CSI: Miami	Jeff McGill	Episode: "Nothing to Lose"
2006	Eureka	Callister Raynes	Episode: "Right as Raynes"
2006	Justice	Jeremy Pierce	Episode: "Wrongful Death"
2006–2007	Whistler	Beck McKaye	26 episodes
2008–2012	Flashpoint	Sam Braddock	75 episodes
2010	Supernatural	Mark Campbell	Episodes: "Exile on Main St.", "Two and a Half Men"
2010	Dexter	Owen	Episode: "Take It!"
2015	Criminal Minds	Ryan Becker	Episode: "'Til Death Do Us Part"
2015	A Mother Betrayed	Jonathan	TV movie
2017	Garage Sale Mystery: The Beach Murder	Steve Winters	TV movie
2017	Gourmet Detective: Eat, Drink and Be Buried	Colin	TV movie
2018	Morning Show Mystery: Mortal Mishaps	Vinnie Hawk	TV movie
2018	Darrow & Darrow: In the Key of Murder	Evan Carleton	TV movie
2018	Colony	Adam Ford	4 Episodes
2018	Morning Show Mystery: Murder on the Menu	Vinnie Hawk	TV movie
2019	Morning Show Mysteries: A Murder in Mind	Vinnie Hawk	TV movie
2019	Morning Show Mysteries: Countdown to Murder	Vinnie Hawk	TV movie
2019	Morning Show Mysteries: Death by Design	Vinnie Hawk	TV movie
2019	The InBetween	Luke Hall	Episode: "While the Song Remains the Same"
2019–2022	Blood & Treasure	Major Reece	3 episodes
2020	Nancy Drew	Chad Vogel	Episode: "The Terror of Horseshoe Bay"
2020	Sacred Lies	Detective Buckner	5 episodes
2021	A Slice of Romance	Austin	TV movie
2023	Come Fly with Me	Hawk Gilbert	TV movie

=== Video games ===
Year	Title	Role	Notes
2012	Max Payne 3	Local Population	

== Awards and nominations ==
Year	Award	Category	Work	Result	Ref
2007	Leo Awards	Best Lead Performance by a Male in a Dramatic Series	Whistler	Nominated	
2017	Leo Awards	Best Supporting Performance by a Male in a Motion Picture	The Space Between	Nominated	
