= Judy Landers =

American actress (born 1958)

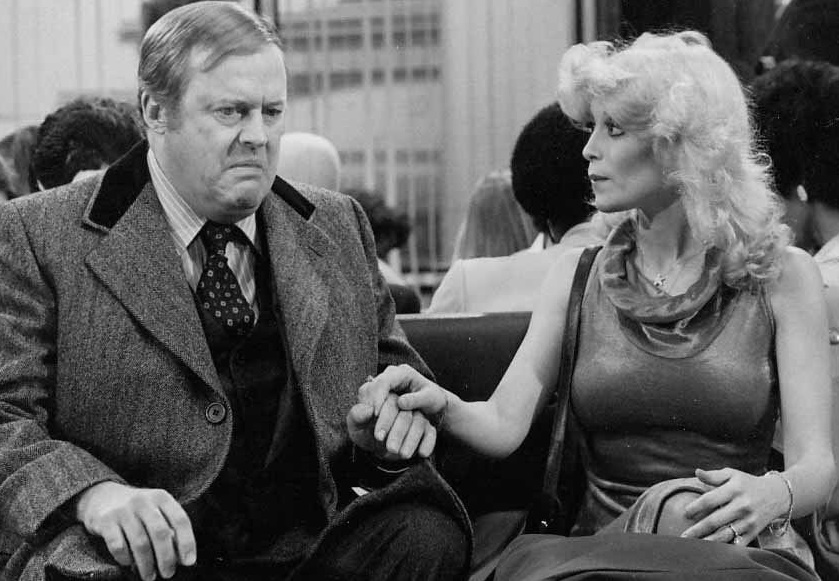
- Landers and Franklin Cover on The Jeffersons
- Born: October 7, 1958 (age 68)
- Occupation: Actress
- Years active: 1976–2019
- Spouse: Tom Niedenfuer (m. 1987)
- Mother: Ruth Landers
- Relatives: Audrey Landers (sister)

Judy Landers (born October 7, 1958) is a retired American film and television actress.

== Early years ==
Landers is from Valley Cottage in upper New York. In 1974 she won that state's tumbling championship over 98 boys and one other girl. A back injury caused her to be inactive for 15 months and diminished her hopes for additional tumbling pursuits. After she graduated from Ramapo High School in 1977, her mother, former actress Ruth Landers, prompted her to join her sister, Audrey Landers, in auditioning for work in commercials in New York. Her auditions were unsuccessful, but she enrolled at the American Academy of Dramatic Arts. She followed Audrey to Hollywood and found work in TV there.

== Career ==
During the 1970s and 1980s, Landers, known for her sweet and friendly persona and her beautiful figure, starred and made several guest appearances in many television series, including eight episodes of The Love Boat (1977), Happy Days (1977), two episodes of Charlie's Angels (1978), 14 episodes of Vega$ (1978-1979), 15 episodes of B. J. and the Bear (1979), The Jeffersons (1979), Buck Rogers in the 25th Century (1980), CHiPs (1980), three episodes of Fantasy Island (1980–84), The Fall Guy (1982), three episodes of Night Court (1984), L.A. Law (1986), Murder, She Wrote (1987) and ALF. Landers was also a series regular for all 75 episodes of Madame's Place (1982–83).

She starred in The Yum-Yum Girls (1976) and appeared twice in both the original Knight Rider (1982, 1985), and The A-Team (1985) television series, but as completely distinct characters with different story lines. Between 1978 and 1981, Landers appeared several times on Match Game and on Match Game-Hollywood Squares Hour.

Landers has also had film roles, including Goldie and the Boxer (1979), The Black Marble (1980), Hellhole (1985), Doin' Time (1985), Deadly Twins (1985), Stewardess School (1986), Armed and Dangerous (1986), Ghost Writer (1989), Dr. Alien (1989), Club Fed (1990), The Divine Enforcer (1992), Expert Weapon (1993), Dragon Fury (1995), Circus Camp (2006), and Manipulated (2019).

Judy and her sister Audrey were featured on the cover of the January 1983 issue of Playboy magazine, and they were in a non-nude pictorial.

Landers has often worked with Audrey, including collaborating with her on the children's shows The Huggabug Club (1995) and The Treehouse Club (1997). Together with their mother Ruth, they own and operate Landers Productions and produced the family film Circus Island (2006).
