= The Huggabug Club =

- Genre: Children's television series
- Created by: Audrey Landers; Judy Landers; Ruth Landers
- Starring: Audrey Landers; Judy Landers; Bret Shefter; Ilysia J. Pierce; Susan Solomon; Ken Jensen; Lorin Benjamin; Amanda Fenester
- Theme music composer: Audrey Landers; Judy Landers
- Opening theme: The Huggabug Club (performed by the cast)
- Ending theme: The Huggabug Club (performed by the cast)
- Composers: Audrey Landers; Ralf Stemmann
- Country of origin: United States
- Original language: English
- No. of seasons: 3
- No. of episodes: 47

Production
- Executive producer: Ruth Landers
- Producers: Audrey Landers; Judy Landers; Ruth Landers
- Production locations: New York City; Tampa, Florida
- Camera setup: Single
- Running time: 30 minutes per episode
- Production company: WEDU

Original release
- Network: PBS Member Stations; Smile
- Release: January 1, 1995 – June 7, 1997

The Huggabug Club is an American children's television series. It first aired on PBS member stations from January 1, 1995 to June 7, 1997, then aired in reruns until July 30, 2000.

== Production and broadcast ==
The series was co-created by veteran actresses and sisters Audrey and Judy Landers, as well as their manager/producer/mother Ruth Landers, who also served as executive producer. The Landers sisters co-wrote over 150 original songs for the series.

An advisory board of teachers and a child psychologist helped to guide the series towards "life skills"-teaching themes. The themes were: integrity; initiative; flexibility; perseverance; organization; sense of humor; effort; common sense; problem solving; responsibility; patience; friendship; curiosity; cooperation; and caring.

The series premiered on PBS from January 1, 1995 to June 7, 1997. Internationally, the series was also broadcast in South Africa, Jordan, Canada and Zambia.

== Cast ==
=== Adults ===
- Audrey Landers as Miss Audrey
- Judy Landers as Miss Judy

In addition to Miss Audrey and Miss Judy, the program features full-bodied puppets who magically appear with the help of a computer: Uncle Huggabug, a cowboy insect; Auntie Bumble, a grandmotherly bee; and Miss Oops-A-Daisy, a clumsy flower. In Season 3, Lovey-Dovey, a peaceful dove. The cast also includes the "Buggsters", a group of multicultural kids who sing and dance.

== Kids ==
- Jamie Starr as Ernie (Season 1)
- Alexie Agdeppa as Grace (Seasons 1-3)
- Lindsey Landers as Kelly (Seasons 1-3)
- Briahnna Odom as Kim (Seasons 1-2)
- Jessica Villareal as Maria (Seasons 1-3)
- Christie Lee Piazza as Sally (Seasons 1-3)
- Landon Prairie as Spencer (Season 1)
- Kristy Landers as Tria (Seasons 1-3)
- Heart Hayes as Allie (Season 3)
- Michael Minden as Alex (Season 2)
- Manner Washington as Jamie (Season 2)
- Bryce Cotton as Bobby (Season 3)
- Valentino Moreno as Jose (Season 3)
- Phillip Jacobs as Leroy (Season 3)

== Episodes ==
=== Season 1 (1995) ===
1. "Express Yourself" (January 1, 1995)
2. "Finders Keepers Not!" (January 8, 1995)
3. "This Land is Your Land" (January 15, 1995)
4. "Safety First" (January 22, 1995)
5. "New Kid in Town" (January 29, 1995)
6. "Farmer Jo-Ann's Farm" (February 5, 1995)
7. "School Days" (February 12, 1995)
8. "Fitness is Fun" (February 19, 1995)
9. "Our Five Scent-Sational Senses" (February 26, 1995)
10. "Wheels, Wings, and Moving Things" (March 5, 1995)
11. "Let's Go to the Zoo" (March 12, 1995)
12. "Rainy Days are Fun!" (March 19, 1995)
13. "Butcher, Baker, Candlestick Maker" (March 26, 1995)
14. "Surprise Pets" (April 2, 1995)
15. "Remember When..." (April 9, 1995)
16. "Cuddly Christmas" (December 3, 1995)

=== Season 2 (1996) ===
1. "Head to Toe" (February 3, 1996)
2. "Tell It Like It Is" (February 10, 1996)
3. "And Baby Makes Four" (February 17, 1996)
4. "Don't Be Bugged by a Bug" (February 24, 1996)
5. "Dinosaurs are Dynamite!" (March 2, 1996)
6. "Surprises from the Sea" (March 9, 1996)
7. "I'm One of a Kind" (March 16, 1996)
8. "That's What Friends are For" (March 23, 1996)
9. "Wacky Weather" (March 30, 1996)
10. "Please Don't Tease" (April 6, 1996)
11. "What Do You Say?" (April 13, 1996)
12. "You Can't Win 'em All" (April 20, 1996)
13. "Let's Celebrate" (April 27, 1996)
14. "Silly Scientists" (May 4, 1996)
15. "Magical, Musical Day" (May 11, 1996)
16. "Dance-a-Thon" (May 18, 1996)

=== Season 3 (1997) ===
1. "A Package to Mexico" (March 1, 1997)
2. "Helping Others" (March 8, 1997)
3. "Outer Space is Out of Sight" (March 15, 1997)
4. "Curious Kids" (March 22, 1997)
5. "We'll Always Be Family" (March 29, 1997)
6. "Get Neat to the Beat" (April 5, 1997)
7. "USA Melting Pot" (April 12, 1997)
8. "1, 2, 3 Learn Your ABC's" (April 19, 1997)
9. "Willie Has Wheels" (April 26, 1997)
10. "Fantastic Firefighters" (May 3, 1997)
11. "Imagine This, Imagine That" (May 10, 1997)
12. "Rootin' Tootin' Reptiles" (May 17, 1997)
13. "Doctor Day" (May 24, 1997)
14. "Sing Along and Learn" (May 31, 1997)
15. "Native Americans" (June 7, 1997)

== Accolades ==
The television series and videotape releases have been awarded The Parents Choice Award, The Dove Foundation Award, and The Kids First Award for quality in children's media.

== See also ==
- Old MacDonald's Sing-A-Long Farm
- Rimba's Island
