= Brian Guidry =

American painter (born 1968)

- Born: 1968 (age 57–58); New Iberia, Louisiana, U.S.
- Education: University of Louisiana at Lafayette (BFA); Pratt Institute (MFA)
- Occupations: Painter; artist
- Style: Contemporary art; installation art
- Website: brianguidry.com/home.html

Brian Guidry (born 1968 in New Iberia, Louisiana) is an American contemporary painter, and installation artist.

== Art ==
While Guidry considers himself primarily a painter, he also works in multiple media such as sculpture, environmental installations and video. Guidry creates installations that in some sense are a recording of the natural environment. The colors he uses in his work have been sampled from the landscape. In the New Orleans installation "Surge", dried Johnson grass (Sorghum halepense) is the source for color. As an artist concerned with the dynamics of the environment, technology, power and the manipulation of nature are recurring themes in his work.

== Life ==
Brian Guidry received his Bachelor of Fine Arts from the University of Louisiana at Lafayette in 1994 and his Master of Fine Arts from the Pratt Institute in Brooklyn, New York in 1997. After living in New York City, he returned to Louisiana in 2001 and currently lives and works in Loreauville, Louisiana. Brian Guidry is currently the Curator of the Acadiana Center for the Arts in Lafayette, Louisiana. He has curated many exhibits with Stephanie Patton as co-curator.

In 2007, he traveled with the late painter Elemore Morgan, Jr. to New York to help facilitate Morgan’s America project. In 2008 Guidry participated with KK Projects, one of the satellite venues of Prospect New Orleans, the New Orleans, Louisiana art biennial organized by Dan Cameron, curator of the New Orleans Contemporary Arts Center. Guidry has since continued to exhibit at the New Orleans Contemporary Arts Center.

== Museum Collections ==
Brian Guidry’s work is found in numerous private and museum collections around the world, including the Ogden Museum of Southern Art in New Orleans, Louisiana; the New York Public Library in New York; the Pratt Institute Library in Brooklyn, New York; the Paul and Lulu Hilliard University Art Museum in Lafayette, Louisiana; and the National College of Arts in Lahore, Pakistan, among others.
