= Club Fed (film) =

- Directed by: Nat Christian
- Written by: Ruth Landers; Jordan Rush
- Produced by: Neil Gordon; Ruth Landers
- Starring: Burt Young; Allen Garfield; Judy Landers; Lance Kinsey; Sherman Hemsley; Karen Black; Joseph Campanella; Mary Woronov; Lyle Alzado; Dee Booher; Wally George
- Cinematography: Arledge Armenaki
- Edited by: Randy D. Wiles
- Music by: Rod McBrien; Questar Welsh
- Production company: Ru-Mar Films
- Distributed by: Trans-Atlantic Films
- Release date: August 9, 1990
- Running time: 93 min
- Country: United States
- Language: English
- Budget: $360,000
- Box office: $2,400,000 (USA)

Club Fed is a 1990 comedy film that spoofs the "Club Fed"-type of minimum security prisons where wealthy white-collar criminals are often sent.

== Plot summary ==
A mobster is murdered by his ex-wife (Dee Booher, credited as Queen Kong), who then spends the rest of the film trying to kill his girlfriend Angelica (Judy Landers). Having been tricked into signing papers that put all of the mobster's holdings in her name, Angelica is arrested and sent to Club Fed, which is more like a luxurious resort than a prison. FBI Chief Vince Hooligan (Joseph Campanella) is determined to have Club Fed shut down, so he assigns Agent Howard Polk (Lance Kinsey) to pose as an inmate and investigate for signs of corruption; also, Hooligan conspires with Warden Boyle (Burt Young) to frame Angelica for embezzlement of prison funds. Meanwhile, Club Fed staff members Jezebel (Mary Woronov) and Brawn (Lyle Alzado) are using techniques such as aversion therapy to rehabilitate the inmates and turn them into ethical business people.

Howard falls in love with Angelica, and he works to clear her name and expose Hooligan's scheme, saving Club Fed in the process. In the epilogue, Hooligan is serving time in a maximum-security prison, Boyle is literally running from the law, Howard and Angelica are married, Howard is the new FBI Chief, and Angelica is the new warden of Club Fed.

== Home media ==
This movie was released on DVD by Trinity Home Entertainment on February 14, 2006.
