= Stephanie Patton =

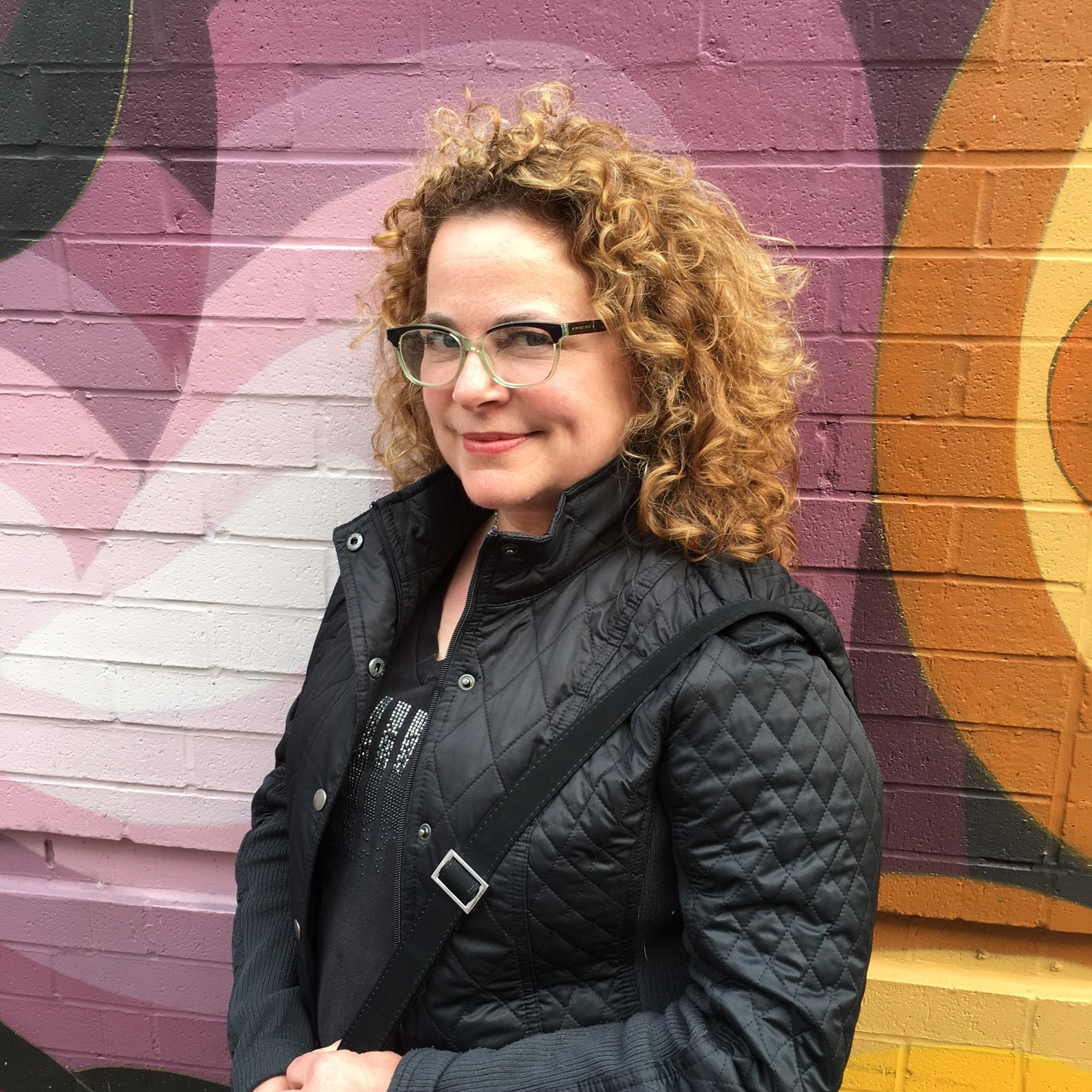
- Stephanie Patton (2017 self portrait)
- Born: August 13, 1969; New Orleans, Louisiana
- Education: B.F.A., University of Louisiana at Lafayette & M.F.A., The School of the Art Institute of Chicago
- Known for: multi-media

Stephanie Patton (born August 13, 1969) is a contemporary multimedia artist. Her work spans across the mediums of photography, sculpture, painting, installation, performance, video, audio and text. Patton’s work is often humorous in nature and frequently investigates aspects of human emotion.

== Early life and education ==
Born in New Orleans, Louisiana, Patton received her Bachelor of Fine Arts degree in Painting from the University of Louisiana at Lafayette in 1993 and a Master of Fine Arts degree in Photography from the School of the Art Institute of Chicago in 1996. She has studied various types of vocal and comedic performance through The New School, Upright Citizens Brigade Theatre and the Gotham Writers' Workshop. After living in New York City, she returned to Louisiana in 2001, where she currently lives and works.

== Art ==
Patton has shown her work nationally and internationally including shows at the Bronx Museum of the Arts, the Ogden Museum of Southern Art, the Contemporary Arts Center (New Orleans), and the McNay Art Museum, amongst others.

She is a founding member of The Front, an artist’s collective in the St. Claude Arts District of New Orleans.

A performance artist, Patton also impersonated the character Renella Rose Champagne since 1993. Renella Rose Champagne hosts a weekly radio show called "Lost in Love" on KRVS, 88.7 FM, www.krvs.org, in Lafayette, LA.

== Collections ==
Patton’s works can be found in the following private art and permanent collections of:

- School of the Art Institute of Chicago, Chicago, Illinois
- Frederick R. Weisman Art Foundation, Los Angeles, California
- Ogden Museum of Southern Art, New Orleans
- New Orleans Museum of Art, New Orleans
- Galerie Patricia Dorfmann, Paris, France.

She has also co-curated many exhibits at the Acadiana Center for the Arts in Lafayette, Louisiana with curator Brian Guidry.
