= Nat Christian =

American actor

Nat Christian is a writer, director and actor.

== Personal life ==
Christian surfed, wrote poetry and took cinema studies in college.

Christian was previously married to Cristina Christian. They have two daughters. Christian and Cristina divorced amicably. Nat remarried Charlotte Christian in 2014 in Los Angeles. They divorced amicably in 2026. Nat refers to Charlotte as a good person.

== Career ==
Christian has directed five features, including Monday Morning (2012), which he also wrote, produced, edited and co-starred (Vanguard Cinema); A socio-political drama set within the context of a Minnesota political campaign and the harsh realities of Los Angeles's homeless community, Monday Morning received a limited release at Laemmle's Music Hall. Due to its subject matter and graphically explicit footage, Monday Morning disturbed some while receiving praise from a number of critics. Because of the footage and the controversy surrounding it, the film is yet to be rated. Monday Morning won the Best Feature Film Award at the Long Island Film Festival, President: Thomas Santorelli, and was the Official Selection at others. It featured Victor Browne, Molly Kidder, Jessica Spotts, Cevin Middleton, Ken Melchior, Robert Axelrod, Nick Cimiluca Robert Pike Daniel, Heather Hall and Nat.Channels, which he also wrote (Vanguard Cinema). For Heaven's Sake (Vanguard Cinema); Club Fed (MGM DVD Cinemax, Comedy Central); "California Casanova" (MGM DVD; Cinamax) was Christian's first film which he also wrote (MGM DVD; Cinamax); and it was made when actor, Jerry Orbach (Law and Order), read the screenplay, written by Christian, and offered to play the lead role in it, which brought about the independent financing. 700 Hill, which he wrote for Monterrey Pictures, is in active development. Christian has had running roles on TV's General Hospital, The Young and the Restless and Days of Our Lives, and various other roles. He was a recipient of a Los Angeles Drama-Logue Critics Award for outstanding performance in Naomi Court. Along with his other fourteen screenplays, Nat also story consulted on "The Duke" (Buena Vista). Nat resides in Los Angeles and Minneapolis.

== Filmography ==
=== Director ===
- Monday Morning (2012) (Vanguard Cinema)
- Channels (2008, Vanguard Cinema)
- For Heaven's Sake (2008, Vanguard Cinema)
- California Casanova (1991, MGM DVD; Cinamax)
- Club Fed (1990, MGM DVD Cinemax, Comedy Central)

=== Actor ===
- Monday Morning (2012)
- Channels
- General Hospital
- The Young and the Restless
- Days of Our Lives
- King Kong Lives
- The New Mike Hammer

=== Writer ===
- Monday Morning (2012), Screenwriter (Vanguard Cinema)
- Channels, Screenwriter (Vanguard Cinema)
- The Duke, Story Consultant (Buena Vista Home Video)
- 1ST DOG, Screenwriter (co) (AppleCreek Communications)
- California Casanova, Screenwriter (MGM Home Video)
- 700 Hill Screenwriter (Monterrey Pictures)

=== Producer ===
- Monday Morning (2012), Producer (2012, Vanguard Cinema)
- Channels, Producer (2008, Vanguard Cinema)
- For Heaven's Sake, Producer (2008, Vanguard Cinema)
- Club Fed, Co-Producer (1990, MGM DVD Cinemax, Comedy Central)

=== Editor ===
- Monday Morning (2012), Editor (2012, Vanguard Cinema)
- Channels, Editor (2008, Vanguard Cinema)

=== Songwriter ===
- Channels, You Make Me Feel Alive - Lyricist (2008, Vanguard Cinema)

=== Articles ===
- WRITTEN BY Writers Guild Of America Magazine (November 2003)
