= Tennessee Volunteers basketball statistical leaders =

The Tennessee Volunteers basketball statistical leaders are individual statistical leaders of the Tennessee Volunteers basketball program in various categories, including points, three-pointers, assists, blocks, rebounds, and steals. Within those areas, the lists identify single-game, single-season, and career leaders. The Volunteers represent the University of Tennessee in the NCAA's Southeastern Conference.

Tennessee began competing in intercollegiate basketball in 1908. However, the school's record book does not generally list records from before the 1950s, as records from before this period are often incomplete and inconsistent. Since scoring was much lower in this era, and teams played much fewer games during a typical season, it is likely that few or no players from this era would appear on these lists anyway.

The NCAA did not officially record assists as a stat until the 1983–84 season, and blocks and steals until the 1985–86 season, but Tennessee's record books includes players in these stats before these seasons. These lists are updated through the end of the 2023–24 regular season. Players active in that season are indicated in bold.

== Scoring ==
Career
Rk	Player	Points	Seasons
1	Allan Houston	2,801	1989–90 1990–91 1991–92 1992–93
2	Ernie Grunfeld	2,249	1973–74 1974–75 1975–76 1976–77
3	Tony White	2,219	1983–84 1984–85 1985–86 1986–87
4	Chris Lofton	2,131	2004–05 2005–06 2006–07 2007–08
5	Reggie Johnson	2,103	1976–77 1977–78 1978–79 1979–80
6	Dale Ellis	2,065	1979–80 1980–81 1981–82 1982–83
7	Bernard King	1,962	1974–75 1975–76 1976–77
8	Dyron Nix	1,877	1985–86 1986–87 1987–88 1988–89
9	Vincent Yarbrough	1,737	1998–99 1999–00 2000–01 2001–02
10	Carl Widseth	1,683	1952–53 1953–54 1954–55 1955–56

Season
Rk	Player	Points	Season
1	Allan Houston	806	1990–91
2	Dalton Knecht	780	2023–24
3	Dale Ellis	724	1982–83
4	Allan Houston	717	1991–92
5	Tony White	711	1986–87
6	Reggie Johnson	698	1978–79
7	Grant Williams	696	2018–19
8	Jordan McRae	692	2013–14
9	Chaz Lanier	684	2024–25
10	Ernie Grunfeld	683	1975–76

Single game
Rk	Player	Points	Season	Opponent
1	Tony White	51	1986–87	Auburn
2	Ron Widby	50	1966–67	LSU
3	Tony White	49	1986–87	Florida State
4	Carl Widseth	47	1955–56	Auburn
5	Grant Williams	43	2018–19	Vanderbilt
	Allan Houston	43	1989–90	LSU
	Ernie Grunfeld	43	1975–76	Kentucky
	Bernard King	43	1975–76	Florida
	Reggie Johnson	43	1979–80	Florida
10	Bernard King	42	1974–75	Georgia
	Bernard King	42	1974–75	UW-Milwaukee

== Rebounds ==
Career
Rk	Player	Rebounds	Seasons
1	Gene Tormohlen	1,113	1956–57 1957–58 1958–59
2	Bernard King	1,004	1974–75 1975–76 1976–77
3	Dyron Nix	944	1985–86 1986–87 1987–88 1988–89
4	Carl Widseth	937	1952–53 1953–54 1954–55 1955–56
5	Wayne Chism	930	2006–07 2007–08 2008–09 2009–10
6	Reggie Johnson	920	1976–77 1977–78 1978–79 1979–80
7	Vincent Yarbrough	862	1998–99 1999–00 2000–01 2001–02
8	Josiah-Jordan James	844	2019-20 2020-21 2021-2022 2022-23 2023-24
9	Jarnell Stokes	836	2011–12 2012–13 2013–14
10	Rob Jones	804	1982–83 1983–84 1984–85 1985–86

Season
Rk	Player	Rebounds	Season
1	Jarnell Stokes	392	2013–14
2	Gene Tormohlen	384	1957–58
3	Gene Tormohlen	372	1958–59
4	Bernard King	371	1976–77
5	Gene Tormohlen	357	1956–57
6	Red Robbins	327	1965–66
	Ian Lockhart	327	1989–90
8	Bernard King	325	1975–76
9	Jarnell Stokes	318	2012–13
10	Rob Jones	317	1984–85

Single game
Rk	Player	Rebounds	Season	Opponent
1	Herb Neff	36	1951–52	Georgia Tech
2	Gene Tormohlen	31	1956–57	Ole Miss
3	Gene Tormohlen	28	1958–59	Michigan
4	Gene Tormohlen	27	1956–57	Arizona
	Herb Neff	27	1951–52	Mississippi State
6	Gene Tormohlen	26	1958–59	Georgia Tech
7	Gene Tormohlen	25	1958–59	Wyoming
	Gene Tormohlen	25	1958–59	Wyoming
	Gene Tormohlen	25	1958–59	Vanderbilt
10	Gene Tormohlen	24	1957–58	Florida

== Assists ==
Career
Rk	Player	Assists	Seasons
1	Zakai Zeigler	747	2021–22 2022–23 2023–24 2024–25
2	Johnny Darden	715	1975–76 1976–77 1977–78 1978–79
3	C.J. Watson	577	2002–03 2003–04 2004–05 2005–06
4	Rodney Woods	525	1972–73 1973–74 1974–75
5	Tony Harris	509	1997–98 1998–99 1999–00 2000–01
6	Tyrone Beaman	491	1980–81 1981–82 1982–83 1983–84
7	Allan Houston	460	1989–90 1990–91 1991–92 1992–93
8	Santiago Véscovi	453	2019–20 2020–21 2021–22 2022–23 2023–24
9	Jordan Bone	405	2016–17 2017–18 2018–19
10	Michael Brooks	397	1980–81 1981–82 1982–83 1984–85

Season
Rk	Player	Assists	Season
1	Zakai Zeigler	275	2024–25
2	Rodney Woods	227	1974–75
3	Johnny Darden	221	1976–77
4	Zakai Zeigler	218	2023–24
5	Jordan Bone	215	2018–19
6	Ja'Kobi Gillespie	201	2025–26
7	Johnny Darden	192	1977–78
8	Tyrone Beaman	184	1982–83
9	Bill Hann	173	1968–69
10	Dane Bradshaw	165	2006–07

Single game
Rk	Player	Assists	Season	Opponent
1	Bill Hann	19	1967–68	Alabama
2	Bert Bertelkamp	16	1979–80	Maryland
	Johnny Darden	16	1977–78	Northwestern
	Rodney Woods	16	1974–75	Georgia
5	Fred Jenkins	15	1986–87	Georgia
	**Zakai Zeigler**	15	2024-25	MTSU
	**Zakai Zeigler**	15	2024-25	Ole Miss
8	**Zakai Zeigler**	14	2023–24	Texas A&M
	Lamonte Turner	14	2019–20	Murray State
	LaMarcus Golden	14	1993–94	South Carolina
	Rodney Woods	14	1972–73	Auburn

== Steals ==
Career
Rk	Player	Steals	Seasons
1	Zakai Zeigler	251	2021–22 2022–23 2023–24 2024–25
2	Santiago Véscovi	212	2019–20 2020–21 2021–22 2022–23 2023–24
3	Vincent Yarbrough	211	1998–99 1999–00 2000–01 2001–02
4	C.J. Watson	198	2002–03 2003–04 2004–05 2005–06
5	Chris Lofton	193	2004–05 2005–06 2006–07 2007–08
6	JaJuan Smith	183	2004–05 2005–06 2006–07 2007–08
	Josiah-Jordan James	183	2019-20 2020-21 2021-2022 2022-23 2023-24
8	Fred Jenkins	177	1983–84 1984–85 1985–86 1986–87
9	Tyrone Beaman	173	1980–81 1981–82 1982–83 1983–84
10	Dane Bradshaw	162	2003–04 2004–05 2005–06 2006–07

Season
Rk	Player	Steals	Season
1	Ja'Kobi Gillespie	79	2025–26
2	LaMarcus Golden	78	1993–94
3	Kennedy Chandler	74	2021–22
4	JaJuan Smith	73	2006–07
5	Zakai Zeigler	70	2024-25
6	Josh Richardson	67	2014–15
	Dane Bradshaw	67	2006–07
	Tyrone Beaman	67	1982–83
9	Clarence Swearengen	66	1988–89
10	Ian Lockhart	64	1989–90
	Jahmai Mashack	64	2024-25

Single game
Rk	Player	Steals	Season	Opponent
1	Ja'Kobi Gillespie	8	2025–26	Oklahoma
	Ja'Kobi Gillespie	8	2025–26	Alabama
3	Kennedy Chandler	7	2021–22	Presbyterian
	Vincent Yarbrough	7	1998–99	UNC-Greensboro
	LaMarcus Golden	7	1993–94	Mercer
	Clarence Swearengen	7	1988–89	UAB
	Clarence Swearengen	7	1987–88	Florida
	Dale Ellis	7	1981–82	Mississippi State
	Terry Crosby	7	1976–77	Florida

== Blocks ==
Career
Rk	Player	Blocks	Seasons
1	C.J. Black	212	1996–97 1997–98 1998–99 1999–00
2	Kyle Alexander	185	2015–16 2016–17 2017–18 2018–19
3	Grant Williams	160	2016–17 2017–18 2018–19
4	Wayne Chism	152	2006–07 2007–08 2008–09 2009–10
5	Doug Roth	146	1985–86 1986–87 1987–88 1988–89
6	Dyron Nix	142	1985–86 1986–87 1987–88 1988–89
7	Isiah Victor	140	1997–98 1998–99 1999–00 2000–01
8	Yves Pons	137	2017–18 2018–19 2019–20 2020–21
9	Charles Hathaway	133	1996–97 1997–98 1998–99 1999–00 2000–01
10	Vincent Yarbrough	131	1998–99 1999–00 2000–01 2001–02
	Armani Moore	131	2012–13 2013–14 2014–15 2015–16

Season
Rk	Player	Blocks	Season
1	Yves Pons	73	2019–20
	C.J. Black	73	1997–98
3	Jonas Aidoo	66	2023–24
4	Kyle Alexander	64	2018–19
	Felix Okpara	64	2024–25
6	Grant Williams	61	2016–17
7	Doug Roth	60	1988–89
8	Kyle Alexander	57	2017–18
9	Grant Williams	55	2018–19
	C.J. Black	55	1999–00

Single game
Rk	Player	Blocks	Season	Opponent
1	Yves Pons	9	2020–21	Florida
2	Yves Pons	6	2019–20	Jacksonville State
	Grant Williams	6	2016–17	Texas A&M
	Kyle Alexander	6	2015–16	TCU
	Wayne Chism	6	2008–09	Kansas
	Elgrace Wilborn	6	2002–03	Georgetown
	Doug Roth	6	1988–89	LSU
	Reggie Johnson	6	1978–79	Biscayne
	Reggie Johnson	6	1976–77	Vanderbilt
