= 2023–24 Tennessee Volunteers basketball team =

American college basketball season

2023–24 Tennessee Volunteers basketball

SEC regular season champions

NCAA tournament, Elite Eight
- Conference: Southeastern Conference

Ranking
- Coaches: No. 5
- AP: No. 5
- Record: 27–9 (14–4 SEC)
- Head coach: Rick Barnes (9th season)
- Associate head coach: Justin Gainey
- Assistant coaches: Rod Clark; Gregg Polinsky
- Home arena: Thompson–Boling Arena

2023–24 Southeastern Conference men's basketball standings
	Conf.				Overall
Team	W		L	PCT	W		L	PCT
No. 5 Tennessee	14	–	4	.778	27	–	9	.750
No. 20 Kentucky	13	–	5	.722	23	–	10	.697
No. 3т Alabama	13	–	5	.722	25	–	12	.676
No. 18 Auburn †	13	–	5	.722	27	–	8	.771
No. 25 South Carolina	13	–	5	.722	26	–	8	.765
Florida	11	–	7	.611	24	–	12	.667
Texas A&M	9	–	9	.500	21	–	15	.583
LSU	9	–	9	.500	17	–	16	.515
Mississippi State	8	–	10	.444	21	–	14	.600
Ole Miss	7	–	11	.389	20	–	12	.625
Georgia	6	–	12	.333	20	–	17	.541
Arkansas	6	–	12	.333	16	–	17	.485
Vanderbilt	4	–	14	.222	9	–	23	.281
Missouri	0	–	18	.000	8	–	24	.250
† 2024 SEC tournament winner Rankings from AP poll

The 2023–24 Tennessee Volunteers basketball team represented the University of Tennessee during the 2023–24 NCAA Division I men's basketball season. The team, led by ninth-year head coach Rick Barnes, played their home games at Thompson–Boling Arena in Knoxville, Tennessee as a member of the Southeastern Conference. The Tennessee Volunteers men's basketball team drew an average home attendance of 19,664 in 16 games in 2023–24.

== Previous season ==
The Volunteers finished the 2022–23 season 25–11, 11–7 in SEC play to finish in a tie for fourth place. As the No. 5 seed in the SEC tournament, they defeated Ole Miss before losing to Missouri in the quarterfinals. They received an at-large bid to the NCAA tournament as the No. 4 seed in the East Region, where they defeated Louisiana in the First Round and Duke in the Second Round to reach the Sweet Sixteen. There, they were upset by Florida Atlantic.

== Offseason ==
=== Departures ===
Name	Number	Pos.	Height	Weight	Year	Hometown	Reason for departure
B. J. Edwards	1	G	6'3"	192	Freshman	Knoxville, TN	Transferred to SMU
Julian Phillips	2	F	6'8"	190	Freshman	Blythewood, SC	Declare for 2023 NBA draft; selected 35th overall by Boston Celtics
Evan Shiflet	3	G	6'2"	191	Freshman	Nashville, TN	Walk-on; left the team for personal reasons
Tyreke Key	4	G	6'3"	207	RS Senior	Celina, TN	Graduated
Olivier Nkamhoua	13	F	6'8"	232	Senior	Helsinki, Finland	Graduate transferred to Michigan
Kent Gilbert	21	G	6'1"	175	Junior	Greenville, NC	Walk-on; transferred
Isaiah Sulack	31	G	6'5"	186	RS Senior	Knoxville, TN	Walk-on; graduate transferred to Marist
Kidd Brizek	32	G	6'6"	194	Freshman	Powdersville, SC	Walk-on; mid season transferred to Manhattan
Uroš Plavšić	33	F	7'0"	251	RS Senior	Ivanjica, Serbia	Graduated/signed to play professionally in Serbia with Mega MIS

=== Incoming transfers ===
Name	Number	Pos.	Height	Weight	Year	Hometown	Previous school
Jordan Gainey	2	G	6'4"	175	Junior	Tucson, AZ	USC Upstate
Dalton Knecht	3	G	6'6"	200	GS Senior	Thornton, CO	Northern Colorado
Grant Hurst	23	G	6'2"	180	RS Sophomore	Cleveland, TN	Walk-on; UT Martin
Kaylan Makan	24	G	6'2"	170	Sophomore	Little Rock, AR	Walk-on; The Citadel

=== Recruiting class ===
College recruiting
Name	Hometown	School	Height	Weight	Commit date
Freddie Dilione V #11 SG	Fayetteville, NC	Word of God Christian Academy	6 ft 5 in (1.96 m)	185 lb (84 kg)	Aug 16, 2022
Freddie Dilione V #11 SG	Recruit ratings: Scout: Rivals: 247Sports: ESPN: (88)				
J. P. Estrella #15 C	Portland, ME	Brewster Academy	6 ft 11 in (2.11 m)	210 lb (95 kg)	Sep 2, 2022
J. P. Estrella #15 C	Recruit ratings: Scout: Rivals: 247Sports: ESPN: (86)				
Cameron Carr #18 SG	Manhattan, KS	Link Academy	6 ft 5 in (1.96 m)	160 lb (73 kg)	Nov 8, 2022
Cameron Carr #18 SG	Recruit ratings: Scout: Rivals: 247Sports: ESPN: (83)				
Cade Phillips #35 C	Jacksonville, AL	Link Academy	6 ft 9 in (2.06 m)	185 lb (84 kg)	May 26, 2022
Cade Phillips #35 C	Recruit ratings: Scout: Rivals: 247Sports: ESPN: (82)				
Overall recruit ranking:
Note: In many cases, Scout, Rivals, 247Sports, On3, and ESPN may conflict in their listings of height and weight.; In these cases, the average was taken. ESPN grades are on a 100-point scale.; Sources: "Rivals.com 2023 Tennessee Basketball Commitments". Rivals.; "2023 Team Ranking". Rivals.

== Roster ==
2023–24 Tennessee Volunteers men's basketball team
Players
Coaches

Pos.	#	Name	Height	Weight	Year	Previous school	Hometown
F	0	Jonas Aidoo	6 ft 11 in (2.11 m)	240 lb (109 kg)	Jr	Liberty Heights Athletic Institute	Durham, NC
G	1	Freddie Dilione V	6 ft 5 in (1.96 m)	195 lb (88 kg)	Fr	Word of God Christian Academy	Fayetteville, NC
G	2	Jordan Gainey	6 ft 3 in (1.91 m)	186 lb (84 kg)	Jr	USC Upstate	Tucson, AZ
G	3	Dalton Knecht	6 ft 6 in (1.98 m)	213 lb (97 kg)	GS	Northern Colorado	Thornton, CO
G	5	Zakai Zeigler	5 ft 9 in (1.75 m)	171 lb (78 kg)	Jr	Our Savior Lutheran	Long Island, NY
F	11	Tobe Awaka	6 ft 8 in (2.03 m)	250 lb (113 kg)	So	Cardinal Hayes HS	Hyde Park, NY
F	12	Cade Phillips	6 ft 9 in (2.06 m)	212 lb (96 kg)	Fr	Link Academy (MO)	Jacksonville, AL
F	13	J. P. Estrella	6 ft 11 in (2.11 m)	241 lb (109 kg)	Fr	Brewster Academy	Scarborough, ME
G	15	Jahmai Mashack	6 ft 4 in (1.93 m)	201 lb (91 kg)	Jr	Etiwanda HS	Fontana, CA
G	23	Grant Hurst (W)	6 ft 2 in (1.88 m)	200 lb (91 kg)	RS So	UT Martin	Cleveland, TN
G	25	Santiago Véscovi	6 ft 3 in (1.91 m)	196 lb (89 kg)	GS	NBA Global Academy	Montevideo, Uruguay
G	30	Josiah-Jordan James	6 ft 7 in (2.01 m)	220 lb (100 kg)	GS	Porter-Gaud School	Charleston, SC
F	35	Colin Coyne	6 ft 9 in (2.06 m)	238 lb (108 kg)	RS Sr	Mary Washington	Fredericksburg, VA
G	43	Cameron Carr	6 ft 5 in (1.96 m)	175 lb (79 kg)	Fr	Link Academy (MO)	Eden Prairie, MN
G	44	D. J. Jefferson	6 ft 5 in (1.96 m)	209 lb (95 kg)	RS Fr	Minnesota Preparatory Academy	Richardson, TX

Head coach

- Rick Barnes (Lenoir–Rhyne)

Assistant coach(es)

- Justin Gainey (NC State)
- Rod Clark (Lindsey Wilson)
- Gregg Polinsky (Northern Arizona)

Legend

- (C) Team captain
- (S) Suspended
- (I) Ineligible
- (W) Walk-on
- Injured
- Current redshirt

Roster

== Schedule and results ==
Date time, TV	Rank^{#}	Opponent^{#}	Result	Record	High points	High rebounds	High assists	Site (attendance) city, state
Exhibition
October 29, 2023*; 3:30 p.m., BTN	No. 9	at No. 4 Michigan State; Charity Exhibition	W 89–88	–	28 – Knecht	8 – Aidoo	6 – Gainey	Breslin Center (14,797); East Lansing, MI
October 31, 2023*; 6:30 p.m., SECN+/ESPN+	No. 9	Lenoir–Rhyne	W 90–48	–	14 – Aidoo	7 – Tied	4 – Tied	Thompson–Boling Arena (16,203); Knoxville, TN
Non-conference regular season
November 6, 2023*; 6:30 p.m., SECN+/ESPN+	No. 9	Tennessee Tech	W 80–42	1–0	17 – Knecht	8 – Aidoo	5 – Zeigler	Thompson–Boling Arena (17,046); Knoxville, TN
November 10, 2023*; 9:00 p.m., Peacock	No. 9	at Wisconsin	W 80–70	2–0	24 – Knecht	7 – Aidoo	3 – Zeigler	Kohl Center (17,287); Madison, WI
November 14, 2023*; 6:30 p.m., SECN+/ESPN+	No. 7	Wofford	W 82–61	3–0	18 – Knecht	7 – Tied	2 – Tied	Thompson–Boling Arena (16,859); Knoxville, TN
November 20, 2023*; 2:30 p.m., ESPN2	No. 7	vs. Syracuse; Maui Invitational quarterfinals	W 73–56	4–0	17 – Knecht	11 – Aidoo	5 – Vescovi	Stan Sheriff Center (4,838); Honolulu, HI
November 21, 2023*; 8:00 p.m., ESPN	No. 7	vs. No. 2 Purdue; Maui Invitational Semifinals	L 67–71	4–1	16 – Knecht	7 – Knecht	3 – Zeigler	Stan Sheriff Center; Honolulu, HI
November 22, 2023*; 2:30 p.m., ESPN	No. 7	vs. No. 1 Kansas; Maui Invitational 3rd Place Game	L 60–69	4–2	21 – Vescovi	11 – Aidoo	3 – Tied	Stan Sheriff Center; Honolulu, HI
November 29, 2023*; 7:15 p.m., ESPN	No. 10	at No. 17 North Carolina; ACC–SEC Challenge	L 92–100	4–3	37 – Knecht	6 – Knecht	7 – Zeigler	Dean Smith Center (20,756); Chapel Hill, NC
December 5, 2023*; 6:30 p.m., SECN+/ESPN+	No. 17	George Mason	W 87–66	5–3	17 – Aidoo	8 – Aidoo	6 – Tied	Thompson–Boling Arena (16,513); Knoxville, TN
December 9, 2023*; 12:00 p.m., CBS	No. 17	No. 20 Illinois	W 86–79	6–3	21 – Knecht	9 – Vescovi	7 – James	Thompson–Boling Arena (21,678); Knoxville, TN
December 12, 2023*; 7:00 p.m., SECN	No. 12	Georgia Southern	W 74–56	7–3	29 – Aidoo	11 – Aidoo	7 – Zeigler	Thompson–Boling Arena (16,013); Knoxville, TN
December 16, 2023*; 10:00 p.m., ESPN2	No. 12	vs. NC State; Basketball Hall of Fame San Antonio	W 79–70	8–3	23 – James	12 – Awaka	8 – Zeigler	Frost Bank Center (2,481); San Antonio, TX
December 21, 2023*; 6:30 p.m., SECN+/ESPN+	No. 8	Tarleton State	W 65–46	9–3	13 – Zeigler	10 – James	5 – Tied	Thompson–Boling Arena (17,609); Knoxville, TN
January 2, 2024*; 7:00 p.m., SECN	No. 5	Norfolk State	W 87–50	10–3	17 – Zeigler	11 – Awaka	5 – James	Thompson–Boling Arena (16,858); Knoxville, TN
SEC regular season
January 6, 2024; 6:00 p.m., SECN	No. 5	No. 22 Ole Miss	W 90–64	11–3 (1–0)	24 – Aidoo	10 – Aidoo	10 – Zeigler	Thompson–Boling Arena (21,932); Knoxville, TN
January 10, 2024; 7:00 p.m., SECN	No. 5	at Mississippi State	L 72–77	11–4 (1–1)	28 – Knecht	6 – Tied	7 – Zeigler	Humphrey Coliseum (8,160); Starkville, MS
January 13, 2024; 12:00 p.m., ESPN2	No. 5	at Georgia	W 85–79	12–4 (2–1)	36 – Knecht	15 – Aidoo	5 – Zeigler	Stegeman Coliseum (10,523); Athens, GA
January 16, 2024; 5:00 p.m., ESPN2	No. 6	Florida	W 85–66	13–4 (3–1)	39 – Knecht	9 – Aidoo	4 – Zeigler	Thompson–Boling Arena (17,332); Knoxville, TN
January 20, 2024; 2:00 p.m., ESPN2	No. 6	Alabama	W 91–71	14–4 (4–1)	25 – Knecht	5 – Gainey	6 – Zeigler	Thompson–Boling Arena (21,678); Knoxville, TN
January 27, 2024; 6:00 p.m., SECN	No. 5	at Vanderbilt; Rivalry	W 75–62	15–4 (5–1)	32 – Knecht	10 – Aidoo	6 – Zeigler	Memorial Gymnasium (13,852); Nashville, TN
January 30, 2024; 6:30 p.m., SECN	No. 5	South Carolina	L 59–63	15–5 (5–2)	31 – Knecht	8 – Awaka	3 – Tied	Thompson–Boling Arena (20,667); Knoxville, TN
February 3, 2024; 8:30 p.m., ESPN	No. 5	at No. 10 Kentucky; Rivalry	W 103–92	16–5 (6–2)	26 – Tied	11 – Aidoo	13 – Zeigler	Rupp Arena (20,265); Lexington, KY
February 7, 2024; 7:00 p.m., SECN	No. 6	LSU	W 88–68	17–5 (7–2)	27 – Knecht	7 – Knecht	9 – Zeigler	Thompson–Boling Arena (21,678); Knoxville, TN
February 10, 2024; 8:00 p.m., ESPN	No. 6	at Texas A&M	L 69–85	17–6 (7–3)	22 – Knecht	7 – Knecht	6 – Zeigler	Reed Arena (12,995); College Station, TX
February 14, 2024; 9:00 p.m., ESPN2	No. 8	at Arkansas	W 92–63	18–6 (8–3)	23 – Aidoo	12 – Aidoo	6 – Zeigler	Bud Walton Arena (19,200); Fayetteville, AR
February 17, 2024; 6:00 p.m., SECN	No. 8	Vanderbilt; Rivalry	W 88–53	19–6 (9–3)	14 – Tied	8 – Aidoo	5 – Tied	Thompson–Boling Arena (21,678); Knoxville, TN
February 20, 2024; 7:00 p.m., SECN	No. 5	at Missouri	W 72–67	20–6 (10–3)	18 – Awaka	10 – Tied	3 – Zeigler	Mizzou Arena (10,089); Columbia, MO
February 24, 2024; 8:00 p.m., ESPN	No. 5	Texas A&M	W 86–51	21–6 (11–3)	24 – Knecht	14 – Aidoo	14 – Zeigler	Thompson–Boling Arena (22,322); Knoxville, TN
February 28, 2024; 7:00 p.m., ESPN2	No. 4	No. 11 Auburn	W 92–84	22–6 (12–3)	39 – Knecht	7 – Aidoo	9 – Zeigler	Thompson–Boling Arena (22,547); Knoxville, TN
March 2, 2024; 8:00 p.m., ESPN	No. 4	at No. 14 Alabama; College GameDay	W 81–74	23–6 (13–3)	18 – Zeigler	13 – James	4 – Tied	Coleman Coliseum (13,474); Tuscaloosa, AL
March 6, 2024; 7:00 p.m., ESPN2	No. 4	at No. 17 South Carolina	W 66–59	24–6 (14–3)	26 – Knecht	9 – Aidoo	7 – Zeigler	Colonial Life Arena (18,000); Columbia, SC
March 9, 2024; 4:00 p.m., CBS	No. 4	No. 15 Kentucky; Rivalry	L 81–85	24–7 (14–4)	40 – Knecht	10 – James	9 – Zeigler	Thompson–Boling Arena (22,206); Knoxville, TN
SEC tournament
March 15, 2024; 1:00 p.m., ESPN	(1) No. 5	vs. (9) Mississippi State; Quarterfinals	L 56–73	24–8	20 – Zeigler	10 – Aidoo	4 – Tied	Bridgestone Arena (17,137); Nashville, TN
NCAA tournament
March 21, 2024*; 9:20 p.m., TNT	(2 MW) No. 6	vs. (15 MW) Saint Peter's; First Round	W 83–49	25–8	23 – Knecht	8 – Knecht	3 – James	Spectrum Center (18,037); Charlotte, NC
March 23, 2024*; 8:00 p.m., CBS	(2 MW) No. 6	vs. (7 MW) Texas; Second Round	W 62–58	26–8	18 – Knecht	9 – Tied	7 – Zeigler	Spectrum Center (18,382); Charlotte, NC
March 29, 2024*; 10:00 p.m., TBS/TruTV	(2 MW) No. 6	vs. (3 MW) No. 11 Creighton; Sweet Sixteen	W 82–75	27–8	24 – Knecht	8 – Mashack	6 – Zeigler	Little Caesars Arena (18,574); Detroit, MI
March 31, 2024*; 2:20 p.m., CBS	(2 MW) No. 6	vs. (1 MW) No. 3 Purdue; Elite Eight	L 66–72	27–9	37 – Knecht	4 – Tied	8 – Zeigler	Little Caesars Arena (18,577); Detroit, MI
*Non-conference game. ^{#}Rankings from AP Poll. (#) Tournament seedings in parentheses. MW=Midwest. All times are in Eastern Time.

== Rankings ==
Ranking movements Legend: ██ Increase in ranking ██ Decrease in ranking т = Tied with team above or below
	Week																				
Poll	Pre	1	2	3	4	5	6	7	8	9	10	11	12	13	14	15	16	17	18	19	Final
AP	9	7	7	10	17	12	8	6	5	5	6	5	5	6	8	5	4	4	5	6	5
Coaches	10	8	8	11	13т	10	7	7	5	5	7	5	5	6	9	5	4	4	5	6	5

== See also ==
- 2023–24 Tennessee Lady Volunteers basketball team
