= JaJuan =

JaJuan is a masculine given name. Notable people with the name include:

- JaJuan Dawson, American football player
- JaJuan Johnson, American basketball player
- JaJuan Smith, American basketball player

== See also ==
- Jacoby Jajuan Brissett (born 1992), American football player
