= 2019–20 Tennessee Volunteers basketball team =

American college basketball season

2019–20 Tennessee Volunteers basketball
- Conference: Southeastern Conference
- Record: 17–14 (9–9 SEC)
- Head coach: Rick Barnes (5th season)
- Assistant coaches: Michael Schwartz; Desmond Oliver; Kim English
- Home arena: Thompson–Boling Arena

2019–20 Southeastern Conference men's basketball standings
	Conf.				Overall
Team	W		L	PCT	W		L	PCT
No. 8 Kentucky	15	–	3	.833	25	–	6	.806
No. 20 Auburn	12	–	6	.667	25	–	6	.806
LSU	12	–	6	.667	21	–	10	.677
Mississippi State	11	–	7	.611	20	–	11	.645
Florida	11	–	7	.611	19	–	12	.613
South Carolina	10	–	8	.556	18	–	13	.581
Texas A&M	10	–	8	.556	16	–	14	.533
Tennessee	9	–	9	.500	17	–	14	.548
Alabama	8	–	10	.444	16	–	15	.516
Arkansas	7	–	11	.389	20	–	12	.625
Missouri	7	–	11	.389	15	–	16	.484
Ole Miss	6	–	12	.333	15	–	17	.469
Georgia	5	–	13	.278	16	–	16	.500
Vanderbilt	3	–	15	.167	11	–	21	.344
Note: The 2020 SEC tournament was canceled after the first round due to the COVID-19 pandemic. Rankings from AP poll

The 2019–20 Tennessee Volunteers basketball team represented the University of Tennessee in the 2019–20 NCAA Division I men's basketball season. The Volunteers were led by fifth-year head coach Rick Barnes. The team played its home games at Thompson–Boling Arena in Knoxville, Tennessee, as a member of the Southeastern Conference. They finished the season 17–14, 9–9 in SEC play to finish in eighth place. They were set to take on Alabama in the second round of the SEC tournament. However, the remainder of the SEC Tournamament was cancelled amid the COVID-19 pandemic.

== Previous season ==
The Vols finished the 2018-19 NCAA Division I men's basketball season 31–6, 15–3 in SEC play to earn a share of the SEC regular season championship. As the No. 2 seed in the SEC tournament, they defeated Mississippi State and Kentucky before losing to Auburn in the championship game. They received an at-large bid to the NCAA tournament as the No. 2 seed in the South region. There the Volunteers defeated Colgate and Iowa in the Second Round before being upset by Purdue in the Sweet Sixteen.

== Offseason ==
=== Departures ===
Name	Number	Pos.	Height	Weight	Year	Hometown	Reason for departure
Admiral Schofield	5	F	6'6"	241	Senior	Zion, IL	Graduated; selected 42nd overall by the Philadelphia 76ers
Kyle Alexander	11	F	6'11"	215	Senior	Milton, ON	Graduated
Brad Woodson	12	G	6'1"	177	Senior	Murfreesboro, TN	Graduated
Lucas Campbell	24	G	6'4"	185	Senior	Knoxville, TN	Graduated
Jordan Bone	0	G	6'3"	174	Junior	Nashville, TN	Declared for the NBA draft; selected 57th overall by the New Orleans Pelicans
Grant Williams	2	F	6'7"	236	Junior	Charlotte, NC	Declared for the NBA draft; selected 22nd overall by the Boston Celtics
Derrick Walker	15	F	6'8"	236	Sophomore	Kansas City, MO	Transferred to Nebraska
D. J. Burns	32	F	6'9"	272	Freshman	Rock Hill, SC	Transferred to Winthrop

=== Coaching changes ===
In April 2019, associate head coach Rob Lanier was hired as the new head coach at Georgia State. Barnes hired Kim English as a replacement later that month.

=== Incoming transfers ===
Name	Number	Pos.	Height	Weight	Year	Hometown	Previous school
Victor Bailey Jr.	13	G	6'4"	190	Junior	Austin, TX	Transferred from Oregon. Under NCAA transfer rules, Bailey will have to sit out the 2019–20 season. Will have two years of remaining eligibility.
Uroš Plavšić	34	C	7'0"	240	Sophomore	Ivanjica, Serbia	Transferred from Arizona State. Under NCAA transfer rules, Plavšić will have to sit out the 2019–20 season. Will have three years of remaining eligibility.

=== 2019 recruiting class ===
College recruiting information
Name	Hometown	School	Height	Weight	Commit date
Josiah-Jordan James; CG	Charleston, SC	Porter–Gaud School	6 ft 6 in (1.98 m)	200 lb (91 kg)	Sep 19, 2018
Josiah-Jordan James; CG	Recruit ratings: Scout: Rivals: 247Sports: ESPN:				
Drew Pember; PF	Knoxville, TN	Bearden High School	6 ft 6 in (1.98 m)	175 lb (79 kg)	Jun 8, 2018
Drew Pember; PF	Recruit ratings: Scout: Rivals: 247Sports: ESPN:				
Davonte Gaines; SF	Buffalo, NY	High School for Health Careers and Sciences	6 ft 6 in (1.98 m)	175 lb (79 kg)	Jul 1, 2017
Davonte Gaines; SF	Recruit ratings: Scout: Rivals: 247Sports: ESPN:				
Olivier Nkamhoua; C	Cumberland, MD	Bishop Walsh High School	6 ft 8 in (2.03 m)	N/A	May 17, 2019
Olivier Nkamhoua; C	Recruit ratings: Scout: Rivals: 247Sports: ESPN:				
Overall recruit ranking:
Note: In many cases, Scout, Rivals, 247Sports, On3, and ESPN may conflict in their listings of height and weight.; In these cases, the average was taken. ESPN grades are on a 100-point scale.; Sources: "Rivals.com 2019 Tennessee Basketball Commitments". Rivals.; "2019 Team Ranking". Rivals.

=== 2020 recruiting class ===
College recruiting information (2020)
Name	Hometown	School	Height	Weight	Commit date
Keon Johnson; SG	Bell Buckle, TN	The Webb School	6 ft 4 in (1.93 m)	185 lb (84 kg)	Aug 6, 2018
Keon Johnson; SG	Recruit ratings: Scout: Rivals: 247Sports: ESPN:				
Corey Walker Jr. PF	Jacksonville, FL	Hargrave Military Academy	6 ft 7 in (2.01 m)	210 lb (95 kg)	Mar 3, 2019
Corey Walker Jr. PF	Recruit ratings: Scout: Rivals: 247Sports: ESPN:				
Jaden Springer; SG	Charlotte, NC	IMG Academy	6 ft 5 in (1.96 m)	195 lb (88 kg)	Oct 23, 2019
Jaden Springer; SG	Recruit ratings: Scout: Rivals: 247Sports: ESPN:				
Overall recruit ranking:
Note: In many cases, Scout, Rivals, 247Sports, On3, and ESPN may conflict in their listings of height and weight.; In these cases, the average was taken. ESPN grades are on a 100-point scale.; Sources: "Rivals.com 2020 Tennessee Basketball Commitments". Rivals.; "2020 Team Ranking". Rivals.

== Preseason ==
=== SEC media poll ===
The SEC media poll was released on October 15, 2019.

Media poll
Predicted finish	Team
1	Kentucky
2	Florida
3	LSU
4	Auburn
5	Tennessee
6	Alabama
7	Mississippi State
8	Ole Miss
9	Georgia
10	South Carolina
11	Arkansas
12	Texas A&M
13	Missouri
14	Vanderbilt

=== Preseason All-SEC teams ===
The Volunteers had one player selected to the preseason all-SEC teams.

Second Team

Lamonté Turner

== Roster ==
2019–20 Tennessee Volunteers men's basketball team
Players
Coaches

Pos.	#	Name	Height	Weight	Year	Previous school	Hometown
G	0	Davonte Gaines	6 ft 7 in (2.01 m)	178 lb (81 kg)	Fr	Hargrave Military Academy	Buffalo, New York
G	1	Lamonte Turner	6 ft 2 in (1.88 m)	187 lb (85 kg)	RS Sr	IMG Academy	Florence, Alabama
F	3	Drew Pember	6 ft 9 in (2.06 m)	207 lb (94 kg)	Fr	Bearden High School	Knoxville, Tennessee
G	4	Jacob Fleschman (W)	6 ft 3 in (1.91 m)	176 lb (80 kg)	RS Jr	Westlake High School	Austin, Texas
G	5	Josiah-Jordan James	6 ft 6 in (1.98 m)	208 lb (94 kg)	Fr	Porter-Gaud School	Charleston, South Carolina
F	10	John Fulkerson	6 ft 9 in (2.06 m)	212 lb (96 kg)	RS Jr	Christ School	Kingsport, Tennessee
G	12	Victor Bailey Jr. (redshirt)	6 ft 4 in (1.93 m)	186 lb (84 kg)	Jr	Oregon	Austin, Texas
G	13	Jalen Johnson	6 ft 6 in (1.98 m)	196 lb (89 kg)	RS Jr	Wesleyan Christian Academy	Durham, North Carolina
F	21	Olivier Nkamhoua	6 ft 8 in (2.03 m)	224 lb (102 kg)	Fr	Bishop Walsh School	Helsinki, Finland
G	23	Jordan Bowden	6 ft 5 in (1.96 m)	193 lb (88 kg)	Sr	Carter High School	Knoxville, Tennessee
G	25	Santiago Véscovi	6 ft 3 in (1.91 m)	188 lb (85 kg)	Fr	NBA Global Academy	Montevideo, Uruguay
F	30	Brock Jancek (W)	6 ft 8 in (2.03 m)	222 lb (101 kg)	So	Knoxville Catholic High School	Knoxville, Tennessee
F	34	Uroš Plavšić (redshirt)	7 ft 0 in (2.13 m)	240 lb (109 kg)	So	Arizona State	Ivanjica, Serbia
G/F	35	Yves Pons	6 ft 6 in (1.98 m)	215 lb (98 kg)	Jr	INSEP Academy	Fuveau, France

Head coach

- Rick Barnes (Lenoir–Rhyne)

Assistant coach(es)

- Michael Schwartz (Texas)
- Desmond Oliver (Dominican (NY))
- Kim English (Missouri)

Legend

- (C) Team captain
- (S) Suspended
- (I) Ineligible
- (W) Walk-on
- Injured
- Current redshirt

Roster

== Depth chart ==
Pos.	Starting 5	Bench 1	Bench 2
C	John Fulkerson	Uroš Plavšić	Drew Pember
PF	Yves Pons	Olivier Nkamhoua
SF	Josiah-Jordan James	Davonte Gaines	Brock Jancek
SG	Jordan Bowden	Jalen Johnson
PG	Lamonte Turner	Santiago Véscovi	Jacob Fleschman

== Schedule and results ==
Date time, TV	Rank^{#}	Opponent^{#}	Result	Record	High points	High rebounds	High assists	Site (attendance) city, state
Exhibition
October 30, 2019*; 7:00 pm, SECN+		Eastern New Mexico	W 107–59	–	23 – Turner	10 – Fulkerson	7 – Tied	Thompson–Boling Arena (6,222); Knoxville, TN
Regular season
November 5, 2019*; 7:00 pm, SECN+		UNC Asheville	W 78–63	1–0	17 – Turner	9 – Fulkerson	6 – Turner	Thompson–Boling Arena (19,273); Knoxville, TN
November 12, 2019*; 9:00 pm, SECN		Murray State	W 82–63	2–0	26 – Bowden	9 – Fulkerson	14 – Turner	Thompson–Boling Arena (16,912); Knoxville, TN
November 16, 2019*; 5:00 pm, ESPN+		vs. No. 20 Washington; James Naismith Classic	W 75–62	3–0	18 – Bowden	7 – Turner	8 – Turner	Scotiabank Arena (6,802); Toronto, ON
November 20, 2019*; 7:00 pm, SECN+	No. 20	Alabama State; Emerald Coast Classic campus game	W 76–41	4–0	16 – Bowden	13 – James	6 – Turner	Thompson–Boling Arena (18,176); Knoxville, TN
November 25, 2019*; 7:00 pm, SECN	No. 17	Chattanooga; Emerald Coast Classic campus game	W 58–46	5–0	17 – Turner	12 – Bowden	12 – Turner	Thompson–Boling Arena (18,556); Knoxville, TN
November 29, 2019*; 7:00 pm, CBSSN	No. 17	vs. Florida State; Emerald Coast Classic semifinal	L 57–60	5–1	20 – Turner	10 – Pons	2 – Turner	The Arena at NFSC (2,500); Niceville, FL
November 30, 2019*; 4:00 pm	No. 17	vs. No. 20 VCU; Emerald Coast Classic	W 72–69	6–1	17 – Fulkerson	7 – Tied	7 – Turner	The Arena at NFSC (2,500); Niceville, FL
December 4, 2019*; 7:00 pm, SECN+	No. 21	Florida A&M	W 72–43	7–1	15 – Fulkerson	13 – Nkamhoua	6 – Turner	Thompson–Boling Arena (17,187); Knoxville, TN
December 14, 2019*; 3:00 pm, ESPN	No. 19	No. 13 Memphis; American/SEC Alliance	L 47–51	7–2	14 – James	7 – Fulkerson	3 – Tied	Thompson–Boling Arena (21,868); Knoxville, TN
December 18, 2019*; 7:00 pm, ESPN2	No. 21	at Cincinnati	L 66–78	7–3	14 – Fulkerson	4 – Tied	6 – Bowden	Fifth Third Arena (12,012); Cincinnati, OH
December 21, 2019*; 1:00 pm, SECN	No. 21	Jacksonville State	W 75–53	8–3	19 – Bowden	9 – Pons	11 – Turner	Thompson–Boling Arena (18,247); Knoxville, TN
December 28, 2019*; 1:30 p.m., CBS		Wisconsin	L 48–68	8–4	9 – Tied	10 – Nkamhoua	5 – James	Thompson–Boling Arena (21,678); Knoxville, TN
January 4, 2020; 12:00 pm, ESPNU		LSU	L 64–78	8–5 (0–1)	18 – Vescovi	6 – Vescovi	6 – Bowden	Thompson–Boling Arena (18,653); Knoxville, TN
January 7, 2020; 7:00 pm, SECN		at Missouri	W 69–59	9–5 (1–1)	13 – Bowden	7 – James	4 – James	Mizzou Arena (8,663); Columbia, MO
January 11, 2020; 1:00 pm, SECN		South Carolina	W 56–55	10–5 (2–1)	15 – Fulkerson	10 – Fulkerson	3 – Tied	Thompson–Boling Arena (19,603); Knoxville, TN
January 15, 2020; 7:00 pm, ESPNU		at Georgia	L 63–80	10–6 (2–2)	12 – Bowden	8 – Pons	3 – Tied	Stegeman Coliseum (10,313); Athens, GA
January 18, 2020; 6:00 pm, SECN		at Vanderbilt	W 66–45	11–6 (3–2)	21 – Bowden	8 – Fulkerson	5 – James	Memorial Gymnasium (12,693); Nashville, TN
January 21, 2020; 9:00 pm, SECN		Ole Miss	W 73–48	12–6 (4–2)	18 – Fulkerson	10 – Fulkerson	6 – James	Thompson–Boling Arena (17,031); Knoxville, TN
January 25, 2020*; 4:00 pm, ESPN		at No. 3 Kansas; Big 12/SEC Challenge; ESPN College GameDay	L 68–74	12–7	24 – Pons	12 – Fulkerson	4 – James	Allen Fieldhouse (16,300); Lawrence, KS
January 28, 2020; 6:30 pm, SECN		Texas A&M	L 58–63	12–8 (4–3)	15 – Fulkerson	7 – Fulkerson	6 – Vescovi	Thompson–Boling Arena (17,722); Knoxville, TN
February 1, 2020; 2:00 pm, ESPNU		at Mississippi State	L 73–86	12–9 (4–4)	16 – Tied	5 – Fulkerson	5 – Tied	Humphrey Coliseum (8,113); Starkville, MS
February 4, 2020; 7:00 pm, ESPNU		at Alabama	W 69–68	13–9 (5–4)	22 – Fulkerson	14 – Pons	5 – Vescovi	Coleman Coliseum (9,651); Tuscaloosa, AL
February 8, 2020; 1:00 pm, CBS		No. 15 Kentucky; Rivalry	L 64–77	13–10 (5–5)	18 – Vescovi	9 – Bowden	3 – Tied	Thompson–Boling Arena (21,232); Knoxville, TN
February 11, 2020; 7:00 pm, SECN		Arkansas	W 82–61	14–10 (6–5)	20 – Vescovi	8 – Fulkerson	8 – Vescovi	Thompson–Boling Arena (17,222); Knoxville, TN
February 15, 2020; 6:00 pm, SECN		at South Carolina	L 61–63	14–11 (6–6)	25 – Fulkerson	9 – Fulkerson	5 – Tied	Colonial Life Arena (15,085); Columbia, SC
February 18, 2020; 6:30 pm, SECN		Vanderbilt	W 65–61	15–11 (7–6)	17 – Tied	7 – Fulkerson	7 – Vescovi	Thompson–Boling Arena (18,562); Knoxville, TN
February 22, 2020; 12:00 pm, CBS		at No. 13 Auburn	L 66–73	15–12 (7–7)	28 – Bowden	10 – Pons	6 – Bowden	Auburn Arena (9,121); Auburn, AL
February 26, 2020; 8:30 pm, SECN		at Arkansas	L 69–86	15–13 (7–8)	19 – Bowden	9 – Pons	3 – James	Bud Walton Arena (14,101); Tuscalooa, AL
February 29, 2020; 2:00 pm, ESPN2		Florida	W 63–58	16–13 (8–8)	22 – Fulkerson	8 – James	6 – James	Thompson–Boling Arena (19,743); Knoxville, TN
March 3, 2020; 9:00 pm, ESPN		at No. 6 Kentucky; Rivalry	W 81–73	17–13 (9–8)	27 – Fulkerson	7 – James	5 – James	Rupp Arena (20,413); Lexington, KY
March 7, 2020; 12:00 pm, ESPN2		No. 17 Auburn	L 63–85	17–14 (9–9)	19 – Fulkerson	7 – Fulkerson	4 – Bowden	Thompson–Boling Arena (21,156); Knoxville, TN
SEC Tournament
March 12, 2020; 1:00 pm, SECN	(8)	vs. (9) Alabama; Second round	Cancelled due to the COVID-19 pandemic					Bridgestone Arena; Nashville, TN
*Non-conference game. ^{#}Rankings from AP Poll. (#) Tournament seedings in parentheses. All times are in Eastern Time.

== Ranking ==
Ranking movements Legend: ██ Increase in ranking ██ Decrease in ranking — = Not ranked RV = Received votes т = Tied with team above or below
	Week																			
Poll	Pre	1	2	3	4	5	6	7	8	9	10	11	12	13	14	15	16	17	18	Final
AP	RV	RV	20	17	21	19	21	RV	—	—	—	—	—	—	—	—	—	—		Not released
Coaches	25	25*	17	16	20	17-T	21	RV	—	—	—	—	—	—	—	—	—	—		

*AP does not release post-NCAA Tournament rankings
