= Yves Pons =

French basketball player (born 1999)

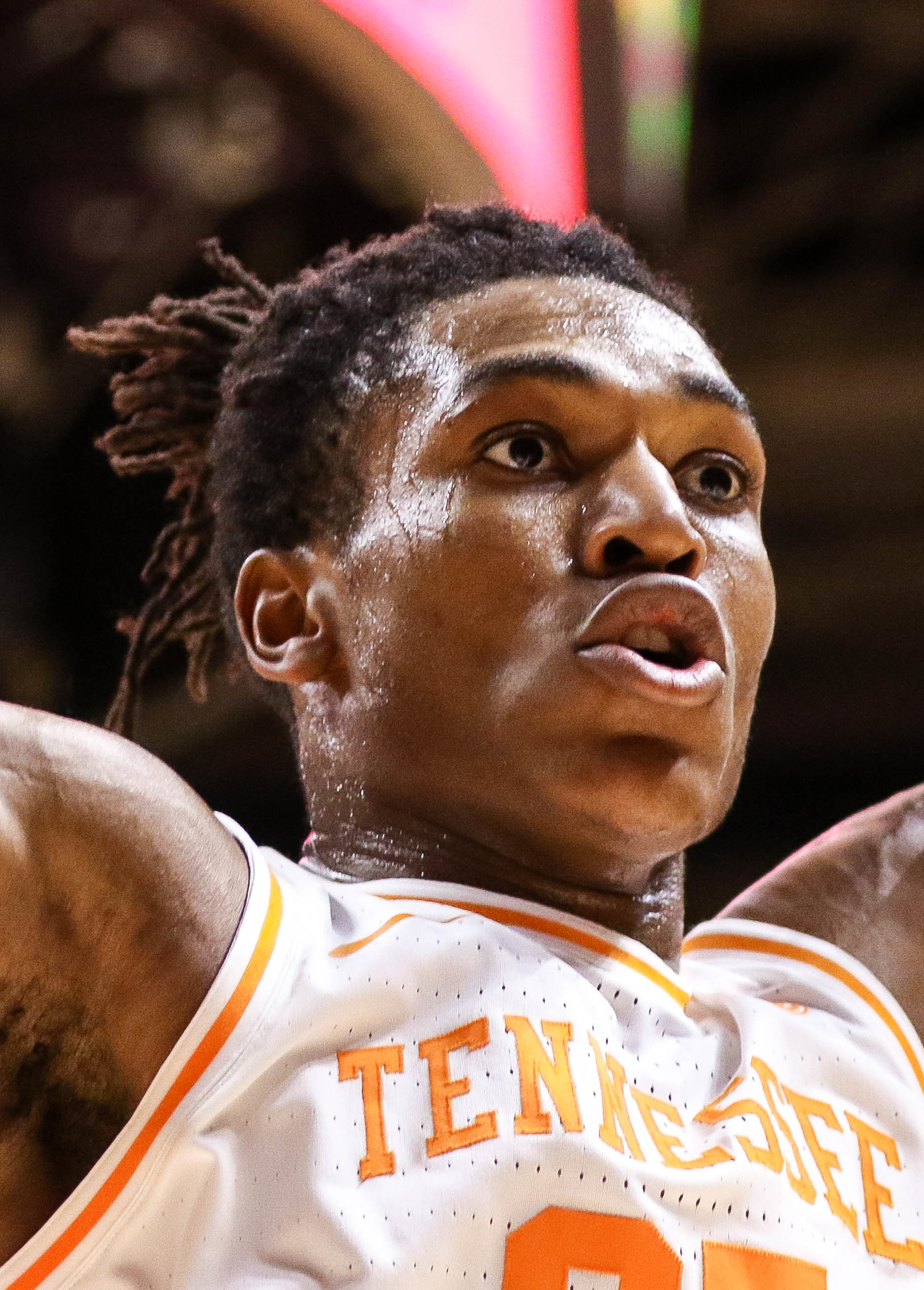
- Pons with Tennessee in 2020

No. 35 – ASVEL
- Position: Shooting guard / small forward
- League: LNB Élite; EuroLeague

Personal information
- Born: 7 May 1999 (age 27) Port-au-Prince, Haiti
- Listed height: 6 ft 5 in (1.96 m)
- Listed weight: 215 lb (98 kg)

Career information
- High school: INSEP (Paris, France)
- College: Tennessee (2017–2021)
- NBA draft: 2021: undrafted
- Playing career: 2021–present

Career history
- 2021–2022: Memphis Grizzlies
- 2021–2022: →Memphis Hustle
- 2022–2023: ASVEL
- 2023–2025: Girona
- 2025–2026: Andorra
- 2026–present: ASVEL

Career highlights
- French League Cup winner (2023); SEC Defensive Player of the Year (2020); 2× SEC All-Defensive Team (2020, 2021)
- Stats at NBA.com
- Stats at Basketball Reference
Medals
Men's basketball
Representing France
FIBA U16 European Championship
Gold medal – first place	2014 Latvia	Team

Yves Pons (born 7 May 1999) is a Haitian-born French professional basketball player for ASVEL of the LNB Élite and the EuroLeague. He played college basketball for the Tennessee Volunteers.

== Early life and career ==
Pons was born in Port-au-Prince, Haiti and spent three and a half years with his biological mom. He was born in Port-au-Prince, which is the capital, but his hometown was Cité Soleil. It's one of the biggest areas in Haiti and is also the poorest part of Haiti. His mom, by law, had to send him to the orphanage because she couldn't take care of him, and he was pretty sick at the time.

After close to a year in the orphanage, Yves was taken in by his adopted parents, Babeth and Jean-Claude Pons, who lived in France. Pons attended French sports institute INSEP, in Paris, and played for its affiliated club Centre Fédéral de Basket-ball in the Nationale Masculine 1 (NM1), the amateur third-tier division of French basketball.

=== Recruiting ===
Pons decided to play college basketball in the United States for Tennessee under head coach Rick Barnes, after being recruited by assistant coach Michael Schwartz. He chose the Volunteers over offers from Florida and Texas Tech. He became the first four-star recruit to play for Barnes at Tennessee and the first French men's basketball player in school history.

College recruiting
Name	Hometown	School	Height	Weight	Commit date
Yves Pons; SF	Fuveau, France	INSEP (France)	6 ft 6 in (1.98 m)	215 lb (98 kg)	Feb 28, 2017
Yves Pons; SF	Recruit ratings: Rivals: 247Sports:				
Overall recruit ranking: 247Sports: 63
Note: In many cases, Scout, Rivals, 247Sports, On3, and ESPN may conflict in their listings of height and weight.; In these cases, the average was taken. ESPN grades are on a 100-point scale.; Sources: "2017 Team Ranking". Rivals.

== College career ==
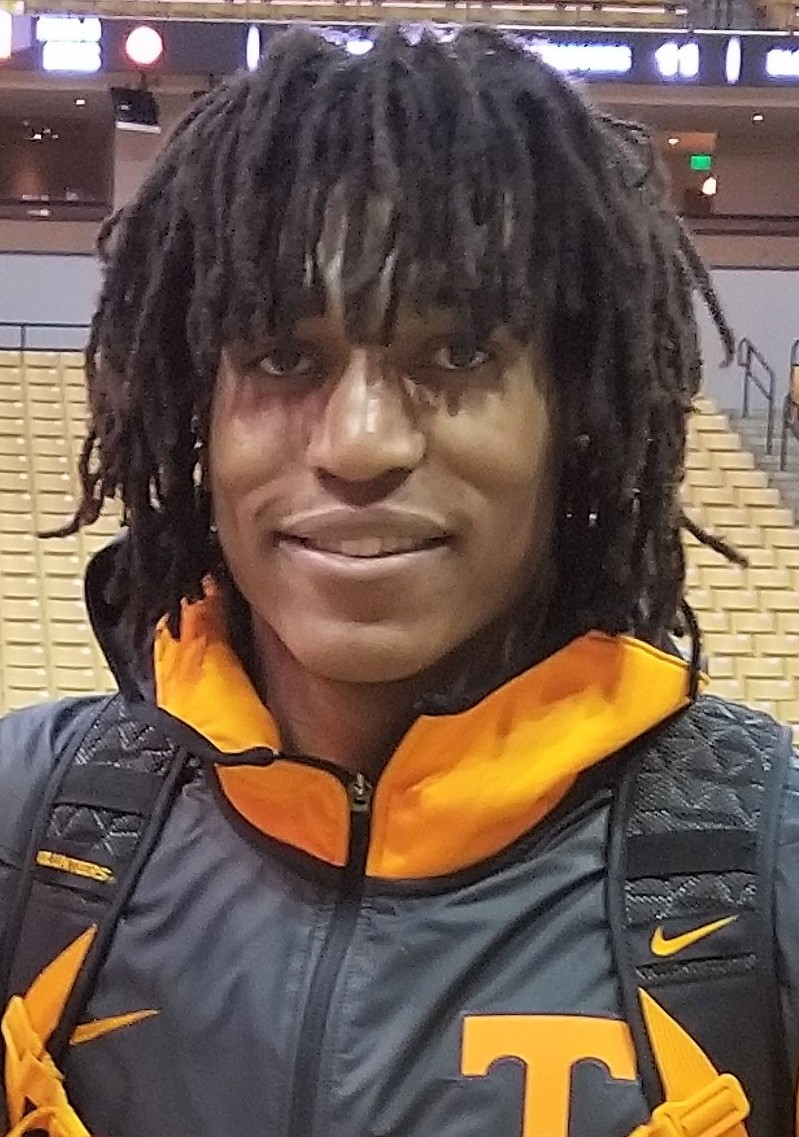
Pons in January 2019

Pons suffered an ankle injury in his Tennessee debut, a win over Presbyterian, and was limited to four minutes. In his freshman season, he played 24 games off the bench and averaged 5.2 minutes per game. As a sophomore, Pons scored a season-high 10 points against Eastern Kentucky in his first career start. In February 2019, Pons suffered a facial fracture in a collision in practice and underwent a corrective procedure. Pons averaged 2.2 points per game as a sophomore, but put in a lot of work on his game after the season. He saw considerable improvement as a junior, scoring a career-high 15 points in his season debut versus UNC Asheville and eclipsing that mark in his next game after scoring 19 versus Murray State. At the conclusion of the regular season, Pons was named SEC Defensive Player of the Year. As a junior, Pons averaged 10.8 points, 5.4 rebounds, and 1.1 assists per game. Following the season, he declared for the 2020 NBA draft. On August 3, Pons announced he was returning to Tennessee for his senior season.

== Professional career ==
=== Memphis Grizzlies (2021–2022) ===
After going undrafted in the 2021 NBA draft, Pons joined the Memphis Grizzlies for the 2021 NBA Summer League. On August 10, 2021, he signed an Exhibit 10 contract with the Grizzlies, which was subsequently turned into a two-way contract. Under the terms of the deal, he split time with the Grizzlies and their NBA G League affiliate, the Memphis Hustle. Pons was transferred to the Hustle on January 30, 2022. On February 6, he was ruled out due to a thigh injury, and missed several games.

=== ASVEL (2022–2023) ===
Pons joined the Brooklyn Nets for the 2022 NBA Summer League. On July 26, 2022, Pons signed a two-year contract with ASVEL of the French LNB Élite. On July 25, 2023, Pons was released from the French club.

=== Bàsquet Girona (2023–2025) ===
On 25 July 2023, Pons signed with Bàsquet Girona of the Spanish Liga ACB. On July 17, 2025, Girona announced Pons was leaving the team, after two seasons playing for the Catalans.

=== Return to ASVEL (2026–present) ===
On July 7, 2026, Pons returned to ASVEL of the French LNB Élite and the EuroLeague.

== National team career ==
Pons won a gold medal with France at the 2014 FIBA Europe Under-16 Championship in Latvia, after averaging 3.8 points per game. He averaged 10.1 points, 4.1 rebounds, and 1.3 blocks per game at the 2016 FIBA Under-17 World Championship in Zaragoza, Spain, as his team finished in sixth place. In 2019, Pons joined France at the FIBA U20 European Championship in Tel Aviv, Israel, where he averaged 2.6 points per game for the fourth-place team.

== Career statistics ==
Legend
GP	Games played	GS	Games started	MPG	Minutes per game
FG%	Field goal percentage	3P%	3-point field goal percentage	FT%	Free throw percentage
RPG	Rebounds per game	APG	Assists per game	SPG	Steals per game
BPG	Blocks per game	PPG	Points per game	**Bold**	Career high

=== NBA ===
Year	Team	GP	GS	MPG	FG%	3P%	FT%	RPG	APG	SPG	BPG	PPG
2021–22	Memphis	12	0	5.9	.313	.333	.000	1.0	.1	.1	.3	1.1
Career		12	0	5.9	.313	.333	.000	1.0	.1	.1	.3	1.1

=== College ===
Year	Team	GP	GS	MPG	FG%	3P%	FT%	RPG	APG	SPG	BPG	PPG
2017–18	Tennessee	24	0	5.2	.500	**.667**	.500	.6	.2	.1	.1	.7
2018–19	Tennessee	**35**	13	11.7	**.516**	.280	.400	1.8	.5	.3	.4	2.2
2019–20	Tennessee	31	**31**	**33.9**	.489	.349	.638	**5.4**	**1.1**	.4	**2.4**	**10.8**
2020–21	Tennessee	26	26	28.5	.466	.274	**.789**	5.3	.7	**.7**	1.8	8.7
Career		116	70	20.1	.484	.318	.653	3.3	.6	.4	1.2	5.7

=== EuroLeague ===
Year	Team	GP	GS	MPG	FG%	3P%	FT%	RPG	APG	SPG	BPG	PPG	PIR
2022–23	ASVEL	30	3	14.4	.494	.324	.462	1.8	.3	.5	.4	3.7	3.1
Career		30	3	14.4	.494	.324	.462	1.8	.3	.5	.4	3.7	3.1
