= Santiago Véscovi =

Uruguayan basketball player (born 2001)

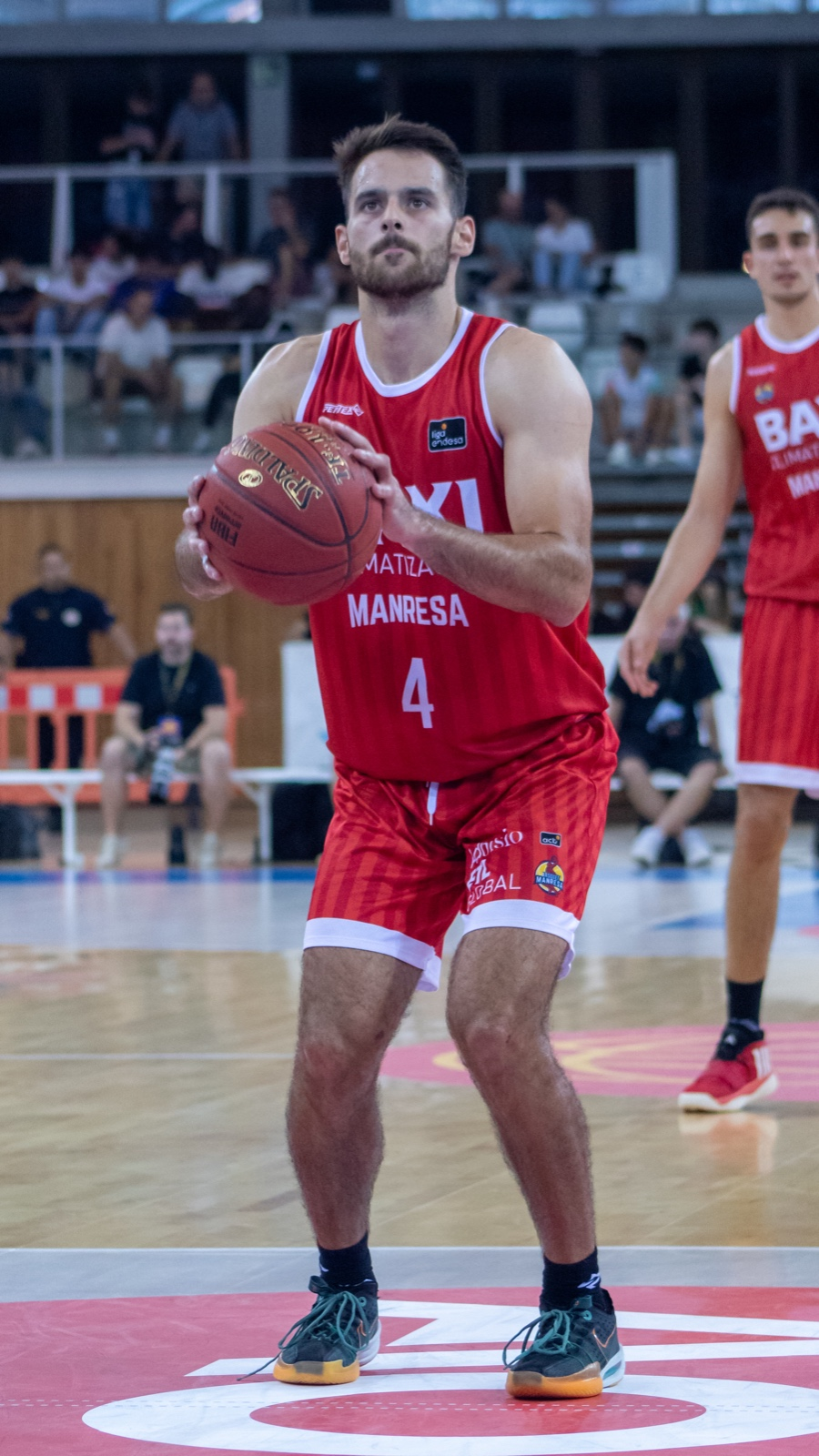
- Véscovi with Manresa in 2024

No. 4 – Peñarol
- Position: Point guard
- League: Uruguayan Basketball League

Personal information
- Born: 14 September 2001 (age 25) Montevideo, Uruguay
- Listed height: 6 ft 3 in (1.91 m)
- Listed weight: 191 lb (87 kg)

Career information
- College: Tennessee (2019–2024)
- NBA draft: 2024: undrafted
- Playing career: 2024–present

Career history
- 2024–2025: Baxi Manresa

Career highlights
- First-team All-SEC (2022)

Santiago Véscovi Vannet (born 14 September 2001) is a Uruguayan professional basketball player for Peñarol of the Uruguayan Basketball League. He played college basketball for the Tennessee Volunteers and professionally for Baxi Manresa of the Liga ACB.

== Early life and career ==
Born in Montevideo, Véscovi grew up playing basketball at the youth level for Club Atlético Bohemios. In July 2017, his performance at a Basketball Without Borders camp in The Bahamas helped him earn an invitation to the NBA Academy Latin America in Mexico City. At age 16, he began attending the academy, while receiving online education through the Apex Learning Virtual School. In July 2019, Véscovi moved to the NBA Global Academy, a training center at the Australian Institute of Sport in Canberra. That month, he led his team to the 2019 NBA Academy Games championship. Véscovi was named most valuable player of the 2019 Skill Factory Tournament of Champions after averaging 17.4 points per game. In September 2019, he averaged 12.5 points, 4.3 rebounds, three assists and 1.5 steals per game for the Uruguay Elite Team at the NBA G League International Challenge.

=== Recruiting ===
Véscovi was considered a four-star recruit by 247Sports and a three-star recruit by ESPN and Rivals. On 22 November 2019, he committed to playing college basketball for Tennessee. He planned on enrolling at the University of Tennessee during the second semester.

College recruiting
Name	Hometown	School	Height	Weight	Commit date
Santiago Véscovi; PG	Montevideo, Uruguay	—	6 ft 2 in (1.88 m)	175 lb (79 kg)	Nov 22, 2019
Santiago Véscovi; PG	Recruit ratings: Rivals: 247Sports: ESPN: (77)				
Overall recruit ranking: Rivals: — 247Sports: 79 ESPN: —
Note: In many cases, Scout, Rivals, 247Sports, On3, and ESPN may conflict in their listings of height and weight.; In these cases, the average was taken. ESPN grades are on a 100-point scale.; Sources: "Tennessee 2019 Basketball Commitments". Rivals.; "2019 Tennessee Volunteers Recruiting Class". ESPN.; "2019 Team Ranking". Rivals.

== College career ==
Tennessee coach Rick Barnes said in December 2019 that it was "highly unlikely" that Véscovi would play in his freshman season, indicating that he would likely redshirt to learn the system. However, with the loss of Lamonte Turner to injury, there was an opening for Véscovi to start at point guard. He was cleared to play for the team on 3 January 2020. One day later, he made his college debut, scoring 18 points, shooting 6-of-9 from three-point range, in a 78–64 loss to LSU. He also posted six rebounds and four assists, while committing nine turnovers. On 11 February, he recorded a freshman season-high 20 points and eight assists in an 82–61 win over Arkansas. In a game at Auburn on 22 February, an Auburn fan was ejected and barred from future games after yelling a xenophobic taunt at Véscovi. He started in all 19 of his appearances as a freshman, averaging 10.7 points, 3.7 assists, 3.3 rebounds and 1.2 steals per game. As a sophomore, Véscovi averaged 8.7 points, 3.7 rebounds and 3.1 assists per game. As a junior, he averaged 13.3 points, 4.4 rebounds, 3.2 assists and 1.7 steals per game. Véscovi was named to the First Team All-SEC as a junior. On 26 March 2022, he declared for the 2022 NBA draft while maintaining his college eligibility.

== Professional career ==
After going unselected in the 2024 NBA draft, Vescovi signed with the Golden State Warriors on July 1, 2024, to play the NBA Summer League.

On July 27, he signed a two-year contract with Spanish club Baxi Manresa. In June 2025 he returned to Uruguay to play for Peñarol of the Uruguayan Basketball League as a franchise player.

== National team career ==
=== Uruguayan junior national team ===
In October 2016, Véscovi averaged 21.8 points, six rebounds and 3.4 assists per game, leading Uruguay to fourth place at the FIBA South America Under-15 Championship in Asunción.

=== Uruguayan senior national team ===
Véscovi debuted for the Uruguayan senior national team at the 2019 Pan American Games in Lima.

== Career statistics ==
Legend
GP	Games played	GS	Games started	MPG	Minutes per game
FG%	Field goal percentage	3P%	3-point field goal percentage	FT%	Free throw percentage
RPG	Rebounds per game	APG	Assists per game	SPG	Steals per game
BPG	Blocks per game	PPG	Points per game	**Bold**	Career high

=== College ===
Year	Team	GP	GS	MPG	FG%	3P%	FT%	RPG	APG	SPG	BPG	PPG
2019–20	Tennessee	19	19	30.3	.373	.360	.808	3.3	**3.7**	1.2	**.2**	10.7
2020–21	Tennessee	27	23	29.2	.388	.373	**.816**	3.7	3.1	1.2	.0	8.7
2021–22	Tennessee	**35**	**35**	31.2	**.413**	**.403**	.793	4.4	3.2	1.7	**.2**	**13.3**
2022–23	Tennessee	33	33	**33.0**	.396	.370	.775	**4.6**	3.1	**1.8**	.1	12.5
Career		114	110	31.1	.397	.381	.795	4.1	3.2	1.5	.1	11.6

== Personal life ==
He is a Peñarol supporter. Véscovi's father, Pablo, played volleyball for Club Atlético Bohemios. His grandfather, Daniel Vannet, played basketball for Bohemios and for the Uruguayan national team. His mother is Laura Vannet and he has a sister, Lucia. Véscovi is of Italian descent.
