= 2022–23 Tennessee Volunteers basketball team =

American college basketball season

2022–23 Tennessee Volunteers basketball

Battle 4 Atlantis champions

NCAA tournament, Sweet Sixteen
- Conference: Southeastern Conference

Ranking
- Coaches: No. 16
- AP: No. 20
- Record: 25–11 (11–7 SEC)
- Head coach: Rick Barnes (8th season)
- Associate head coach: Justin Gainey
- Assistant coaches: Rod Clark; Gregg Polinsky
- Home arena: Thompson–Boling Arena

2022–23 Southeastern Conference men's basketball standings
	Conf.				Overall
Team	W		L	PCT	W		L	PCT
No. 1 Alabama†	16	–	2	.889	31	–	6	.838
No. 17 Texas A&M	15	–	3	.833	25	–	10	.714
Kentucky	12	–	6	.667	22	–	12	.647
No. 23 Missouri	11	–	7	.611	25	–	10	.714
No. 20 Tennessee	11	–	7	.611	25	–	11	.694
Vanderbilt	11	–	7	.611	22	–	15	.595
Auburn	10	–	8	.556	21	–	13	.618
Florida	9	–	9	.500	16	–	17	.485
Mississippi State	8	–	10	.444	21	–	13	.618
Arkansas	8	–	10	.444	22	–	14	.611
Georgia	6	–	12	.333	16	–	16	.500
South Carolina	4	–	14	.222	11	–	21	.344
Ole Miss	3	–	15	.167	12	–	21	.364
LSU	2	–	16	.111	14	–	19	.424
† 2023 SEC tournament winner Rankings from AP poll

The 2022–23 Tennessee Volunteers basketball team represented the University of Tennessee during the 2022–23 NCAA Division I men's basketball season. The team was led by eighth-year head coach Rick Barnes, and played their home games at Thompson–Boling Arena in Knoxville, Tennessee as a member of the Southeastern Conference. They finished the season 22–9, 11–7 in SEC play to finish in a tie for fourth place. As the No. 5 seed in the SEC tournament, they defeated Ole Miss before losing to Missouri in the quarterfinals. They received an at-large bid to the NCAA tournament as the No. 4 seed in the East Region, where they defeated Louisiana in the First Round and Duke in the Second Round to reach the Sweet Sixteen. There, they were upset by Florida Atlantic, closing their season with an overall record of 25–11.

== Previous season ==
The Volunteers finished the 2021–22 season 27–8, 14–4 in SEC play to finish in a tie for second place. As the No. 2 seed in the SEC tournament, they defeated Mississippi State, Kentucky and Texas A&M to win their first SEC Tournament title since 1979. They received the conference's automatic bid to the NCAA tournament as the No. 3 seed in the South Region, where they defeated Longwood in the first round before being upset by Michigan in the second round.

== Offseason ==
=== Departures ===
Name	Number	Pos.	Height	Weight	Year	Hometown	Reason for departure
Kennedy Chandler	1	G	6'0"	171	Freshman	Memphis, TN	Declared for 2022 NBA draft
Brandon Huntley-Hatfield	2	F	6'10"	246	Freshman	Clarksville, TN	Transferred to Louisville
Quentin Diboundje	3	G	6'5"	217	Freshman	Montpellier, France	Transferred to East Carolina
John Fulkerson	10	F	6'9"	219	GS Senior	Kingsport, TN	Graduated
Victor Bailey Jr.	12	G	6'4"	182	RS Senior	Austin, TX	Graduate transferred to George Mason
Justin Powell	24	G	6'6"	197	Sophomore	Prospect, KY	Transferred to Washington State
Handje Tamba	32	F	6'11"	229	Freshman	Knoxville, TN	Transferred to Weber State
Cole Morris	34	F	6'9"	211	Sophomore	Marietta, GA	Walk-on; left the team for personal reasons
Brock Janeck	35	F	6'8"	228	Senior	Knoxville, TN	Walk-on; graduate transferred to East Tennessee State

=== Incoming transfers ===
Name	Number	Pos.	Height	Weight	Year	Hometown	Previous school
Tyreke Key	4	G	6'3"	205	GS Senior	Celina, TN	Indiana State
Colin Coyne	35	F	6'10"	225	Senior	Fredericksburg, VA	Mary Washington

=== 2022 recruiting class ===
College recruiting
Name	Hometown	School	Height	Weight	Commit date
Julian Phillips #8 SF	Blythewood, SC	Link Academy	6 ft 7 in (2.01 m)	230 lb (100 kg)	May 12, 2022
Julian Phillips #8 SF	Recruit ratings: Scout: Rivals: 247Sports: ESPN: (92)				
B. J. Edwards #33 PG	Knoxville, TN	Knoxville Catholic High School	6 ft 1 in (1.85 m)	165 lb (75 kg)	Jun 30, 2021
B. J. Edwards #33 PG	Recruit ratings: Scout: Rivals: 247Sports: ESPN: (82)				
D. J. Jefferson #25 PG	Saint Paul, MN	Minnesota Prep	6 ft 5 in (1.96 m)	185 lb (84 kg)	May 24, 2022
D. J. Jefferson #25 PG	Recruit ratings: Scout: Rivals: 247Sports: ESPN: (81)				
Tobe Awaka; PF	Bronx, NY	Cardinal Hayes	6 ft 1 in (1.85 m)	165 lb (75 kg)	May 17, 2022
Tobe Awaka; PF	Recruit ratings: Scout: Rivals: 247Sports: ESPN: (NR)				
Overall recruit ranking:
Note: In many cases, Scout, Rivals, 247Sports, On3, and ESPN may conflict in their listings of height and weight.; In these cases, the average was taken. ESPN grades are on a 100-point scale.; Sources: "Rivals.com 2022 Tennessee Basketball Commitments". Rivals.; "2022 Team Ranking". Rivals.

=== 2023 recruiting class ===
College recruiting (2023)
Name	Hometown	School	Height	Weight	Commit date
Freddie Dilione V #8 SG	Fayetteville, NC	Word of God Christian Academy	6 ft 5 in (1.96 m)	185 lb (84 kg)	Aug 16, 2022
Freddie Dilione V #8 SG	Recruit ratings: Scout: Rivals: 247Sports: ESPN: (88)				
J. P. Estrella #10 C	Portland, ME	Brewster Academy	6 ft 11 in (2.11 m)	210 lb (95 kg)	Sep 2, 2022
J. P. Estrella #10 C	Recruit ratings: Scout: Rivals: 247Sports: ESPN: (86)				
Cade Phillips #41 C	Jacksonville, AL	Link Academy	6 ft 9 in (2.06 m)	185 lb (84 kg)	May 26, 2022
Cade Phillips #41 C	Recruit ratings: Scout: Rivals: 247Sports: ESPN: (82)				
Overall recruit ranking:
Note: In many cases, Scout, Rivals, 247Sports, On3, and ESPN may conflict in their listings of height and weight.; In these cases, the average was taken. ESPN grades are on a 100-point scale.; Sources: "Rivals.com 2023 Tennessee Basketball Commitments". Rivals.; "2023 Team Ranking". Rivals.

== Roster ==
2022–23 Tennessee Volunteers men's basketball team
Players
Coaches

Pos.	#	Name	Height	Weight	Year	Previous school	Hometown
F	0	Jonas Aidoo	6 ft 11 in (2.11 m)	241 lb (109 kg)	So	Liberty Heights Athletic Institute	Durham, NC
G	1	B. J. Edwards	6 ft 3 in (1.91 m)	188 lb (85 kg)	Fr	Knoxville Catholic HS	Knoxville, TN
F	2	Julian Phillips	6 ft 8 in (2.03 m)	198 lb (90 kg)	Fr	Link Academy (MO)	Blythewood, SC
G	3	Evan Shiflet (W)	6 ft 2 in (1.88 m)	197 lb (89 kg)	Fr	Christ Presbyterian Academy	Nashville, TN
G	4	Tyreke Key	6 ft 2 in (1.88 m)	211 lb (96 kg)	RS Sr	Indiana State	Celina, TN
G	5	Zakai Zeigler	5 ft 9 in (1.75 m)	171 lb (78 kg)	So	Our Savior Lutheran	Long Island, NY
G	10	Freddie Dilione V (redshirt)	6 ft 5 in (1.96 m)	180 lb (82 kg)	Fr	Word of God Christian Academy	Fayetteville, NC
F	11	Tobe Awaka	6 ft 8 in (2.03 m)	250 lb (113 kg)	Fr	Cardinal Hayes HS	Hyde Park, NY
F	13	Olivier Nkamhoua	6 ft 9 in (2.06 m)	236 lb (107 kg)	Sr	Bishop Walsh School	Helsinki, Finland
G	15	Jahmai Mashack	6 ft 4 in (1.93 m)	201 lb (91 kg)	So	Etiwanda HS	Fontana, CA
G	21	Kent Gilbert (W)	6 ft 1 in (1.85 m)	178 lb (81 kg)	Jr	Conley HS	Greenville, NC
F	24	Alec Kegler	6 ft 4 in (1.93 m)	212 lb (96 kg)	So	Roane State CC	Clarksville, TN
G	25	Santiago Véscovi	6 ft 3 in (1.91 m)	192 lb (87 kg)	Sr	NBA Global Academy	Montevideo, Uruguay
G	30	Josiah-Jordan James	6 ft 6 in (1.98 m)	224 lb (102 kg)	Sr	Porter-Gaud School	Charleston, SC
G	31	Isaiah Sulack (W)	6 ft 5 in (1.96 m)	192 lb (87 kg)	RS Sr	Bossier Parish Community College	Knoxville, TN
F	33	Uroš Plavšić	7 ft 1 in (2.16 m)	265 lb (120 kg)	RS Sr	Arizona State	Ivanjica, Serbia
F	35	Colin Coyne	6 ft 9 in (2.06 m)	239 lb (108 kg)	Sr	Mary Washington	Fredericksburg, VA
G	44	D. J. Jefferson	6 ft 5 in (1.96 m)	207 lb (94 kg)	Fr	Minnesota Preparatory Academy	Richardson, TX

Head coach

- Rick Barnes (Lenoir–Rhyne)

Assistant coach(es)

- Justin Gainey (NC State)
- Rod Clark (Lindsey Wilson)
- Gregg Polinsky (Northern Arizona)

Legend

- (C) Team captain
- (S) Suspended
- (I) Ineligible
- (W) Walk-on
- Injured
- Current redshirt

Roster

== Schedule and results ==
Date time, TV	Rank^{#}	Opponent^{#}	Result	Record	High points	High rebounds	High assists	Site (attendance) city, state
Exhibition
October 28, 2022*; 9:00 p.m., PPV.com	No. 11	vs. No. 2 Gonzaga; Legends of Basketball Charity Classic	W 99–80		26 – Key	14 – Nkamhoua	8 – Zeigler	Comerica Center (2,738); Frisco, TX
Regular season
November 7, 2022*; 7:00 p.m., SECN+	No. 11	Tennessee Tech	W 75–43	1–0	17 – Key	8 – Vescovi	5 – Tied	Thompson–Boling Arena (17,957); Knoxville, TN
November 13, 2022*; 2:00 p.m., ESPN	No. 11	vs. Colorado	L 66–78	1–1	15 – Tied	10 – Nkamhoua	4 – Zeigler	Bridgestone Arena (12,482); Nashville, TN
November 16, 2022*; 7:00 p.m., SECN+	No. 22	Florida Gulf Coast	W 81–50	2–1	18 – Tied	6 – Tied	3 – Vescovi	Thompson–Boling Arena (16,524); Knoxville, TN
November 23, 2022*; 7:30 p.m., ESPN2	No. 22	vs. Butler; Battle 4 Atlantis Quarterfinals	W 71–45	3–1	13 – Vescovi	6 – Tied	5 – Zeigler	Imperial Arena (465); Nassau, BAH
November 24, 2022*; 1:30 p.m., ESPN2	No. 22	vs. USC; Battle 4 Atlantis semifinals	W 73–66	4–1	25 – Phillips	9 – Aidoo	5 – Vescovi	Imperial Arena (432); Nassau, BAH
November 25, 2022*; 7:30 p.m., ESPN	No. 22	vs. No. 3 Kansas; Battle 4 Atlantis championship	W 64–50	5–1	20 – Vescovi	9 – Aidoo	3 – Zeigler	Imperial Arena (2,018); Nassau, BAH
November 30, 2022*; 7:15 p.m., SECN	No. 13	McNeese State	W 76–40	6–1	16 – Vescovi	6 – Tied	4 – Phillips	Thompson–Boling Arena (15,927); Knoxville, TN
December 4, 2022*; 4:00 p.m., SECN	No. 13	Alcorn State	W 94–40	7–1	20 – Nkamhoua	7 – Mashack	6 – Nkamhoua	Thompson–Boling Arena (16,481); Knoxville, TN
December 7, 2022*; 7:00 p.m., SECN	No. 7	Eastern Kentucky	W 84–49	8–1	17 – Key	10 – Phillips	5 – Zeigler	Thompson–Boling Arena (15,746); Knoxville, TN
December 11, 2022*; 4:30 p.m., FS1	No. 7	vs. No. 13 Maryland; Basketball Hall of Fame Invitational	W 56–53	9–1	12 – Zeigler	10 – Phillips	3 – Tied	Barclays Center (8,028); Brooklyn, NY
December 17, 2022*; 10:30 p.m., ESPN2	No. 6	at No. 9 Arizona	L 70–75	9–2	21 – Zeigler	6 – Tied	5 – Tied	McKale Center (14,688); Tucson, AZ
December 21, 2022*; 6:00 p.m., SECN+	No. 8	Austin Peay	W 86–44	10–2	20 – Nkamhoua	11 – Awaka	5 – Tied	Thompson–Boling Arena (18,120); Knoxville, TN
December 28, 2022; 5:00 p.m., SECN	No. 7	at Ole Miss	W 63–59	11–2 (1–0)	22 – Vescovi	13 – Aidoo	3 – Tied	SJB Pavilion (7,013); Oxford, MS
January 3, 2023; 7:00 p.m., ESPNU	No. 8	Mississippi State	W 87–53	12–2 (2–0)	14 – Vescovi	7 – Phillips	10 – Zeigler	Thompson–Boling Arena (16,697); Knoxville, TN
January 7, 2023; 3:30 p.m., SECN	No. 8	at South Carolina	W 85–42	13–2 (3–0)	21 – Nkamhoua	10 – Nkamhoua	8 – Zeigler	Colonial Life Arena (10,704); Columbia, SC
January 10, 2023; 9:00 p.m., SECN	No. 5	Vanderbilt; Rivalry	W 77–68	14–2 (4–0)	15 – Tied	6 – Tied	9 – Zeigler	Thompson–Boling Arena (16,255); Knoxville, TN
January 14, 2023; 12:00 p.m., ESPN	No. 5	Kentucky; Rivalry	L 56–63	14–3 (4–1)	19 – Plavsic	5 – James	7 – Zeigler	Thompson–Boling Arena (21,678); Knoxville, TN
January 17, 2023; 7:00 p.m., ESPN2	No. 9	at Mississippi State	W 70–59	15–3 (5–1)	24 – Zeigler	11 – Phillips	4 – Zeigler	Humphrey Coliseum (8,797); Starkville, MS
January 21, 2023; 4:00 p.m., ESPN	No. 9	at LSU	W 77–56	16–3 (6–1)	22 – James	7 – Tied	10 – Zeigler	Pete Maravich Assembly Center (10,462); Baton Rouge, LA
January 25, 2023; 7:00 p.m., SECN	No. 4	Georgia	W 70–41	17–3 (7–1)	11 – Zeigler	7 – James	7 – Zeigler	Thompson–Boling Arena (19,802); Knoxville, TN
January 28, 2023*; 6:00 p.m., ESPN	No. 4	No. 10 Texas; Big 12/SEC Challenge; College GameDay	W 82–71	18–3	27 – Nkamhoua	8 – Nkamhoua	10 – Zeigler	Thompson–Boling Arena (21,678); Knoxville, TN
February 1, 2023; 7:00 p.m., ESPN2	No. 2	at Florida	L 54–67	18–4 (7–2)	15 – Ziegler	9 – Nkamhoua	3 – Zeigler	O'Connell Center (10,160); Gainesville, FL
February 4, 2023; 2:00 p.m., ESPN	No. 2	No. 25 Auburn	W 46–43	19–4 (8–2)	15 – James	14 – James	6 – Zeigler	Thompson–Boling Arena (21,678); Knoxville, TN
February 8, 2023; 7:00 p.m., SECN	No. 6	at Vanderbilt; Rivalry	L 65–66	19–5 (8–3)	14 – Tied	9 – Awaka	7 – Zeigler	Memorial Gymnasium (10,483); Nashville, TN
February 11, 2023; 6:00 p.m., SECN	No. 6	Missouri	L 85–86	19–6 (8–4)	23 – Key	7 – Awaka	10 – Zeigler	Thompson–Boling Arena (21,678); Knoxville, TN
February 15, 2023; 7:00 p.m., ESPN2	No. 10	No. 1 Alabama	W 68–59	20–6 (9–4)	15 – Tied	11 – Aidoo	8 – Zeigler	Thompson–Boling Arena (21,678); Knoxville, TN
February 18, 2023; 1:00 p.m., CBS	No. 10	at Kentucky; Rivalry	L 54–66	20–7 (9–5)	17 – Vescovi	8 – Mashack	3 – Tied	Rupp Arena (20,323); Lexington, KY
February 21, 2023; 7:00 p.m., ESPN	No. 11	at No. 25 Texas A&M	L 63–68	20–8 (9–6)	14 – Tied	10 – Vescovi	7 – Vescovi	Reed Arena (12,989); College Station, TX
February 25, 2023; 6:00 p.m., SECN	No. 11	South Carolina	W 85–45	21–8 (10–6)	18 – James	8 – Nkamhoua	11 – Ziegler	Thompson–Boling Arena (20,273); Knoxville, TN
February 28, 2023; 9:00 p.m., ESPN2	No. 12	Arkansas	W 75–57	22–8 (11–6)	16 – Nkamhoua	8 – Awaka	5 – Tied	Thompson–Boling Arena (18,324); Knoxville, TN
March 4, 2023; 2:00 p.m., ESPN	No. 12	at Auburn	L 70–79	22–9 (11–7)	21 – Vescovi	10 – Awaka	4 – Vescovi	Neville Arena (9,121); Auburn, AL
SEC tournament
March 9, 2023; 3:00 p.m., SECN	(5) No. 17	vs. (13) Ole Miss; Second round	W 70–55	23–9	20 – James	7 – James	4 – Nkamhoua	Bridgestone Arena (13,165); Nashville, TN
March 10, 2023; 3:00 p.m., ESPN	(5) No. 17	vs. (4) No. 25 Missouri; Quarterfinals	L 71–79	23–10	17 – Vescovi	10 – Nkamhoua	4 – Mashack	Bridgestone Arena (16,107); Nashville, TN
NCAA Tournament
March 16, 2023*; 9:40 pm, CBS	(4 E) No. 20	vs. (13 E) Louisiana; First Round	W 58–55	24–10	12 – Key	5 – Nkamhoua	4 – Vescovi	Amway Center (18,018); Orlando, FL
March 18, 2023*; 2:40 pm, CBS	(4 E) No. 20	vs. (5 E) No. 12 Duke; Second Round	W 65–52	25–10	27 – Nkamhoua	5 – Tied	5 – Vescovi	Amway Center (18,567); Orlando, FL
March 23, 2023*; 9:00 p.m., TBS	(4 E) No. 20	vs. (9 E) No. 25 Florida Atlantic; Sweet Sixteen	L 55–62	25–11	10 – Tied	7 – Tied	4 – Tied	Madison Square Garden (19,624); New York, NY
*Non-conference game. ^{#}Rankings from AP Poll. (#) Tournament seedings in parentheses. E=East. All times are in Eastern Time.

== Rankings ==
Ranking movements Legend: ██ Increase in ranking ██ Decrease in ranking ( ) = First-place votes
	Week																			
Poll	Pre	1	2	3	4	5	6	7	8	9	10	11	12	13	14	15	16	17	18	Final
AP	11	22	22	13	7	6 (1)	8	7	8	5	9	4	2	6	10	11	12	17	20	Not released
Coaches	11	17	21	13	7	7	11	10	9	5	9	4	2	5 (2)	11	13	14	19	21	16

== See also ==
- 2022–23 Tennessee Lady Volunteers basketball team
