= Josiah-Jordan James =

American basketball player (born 2000)

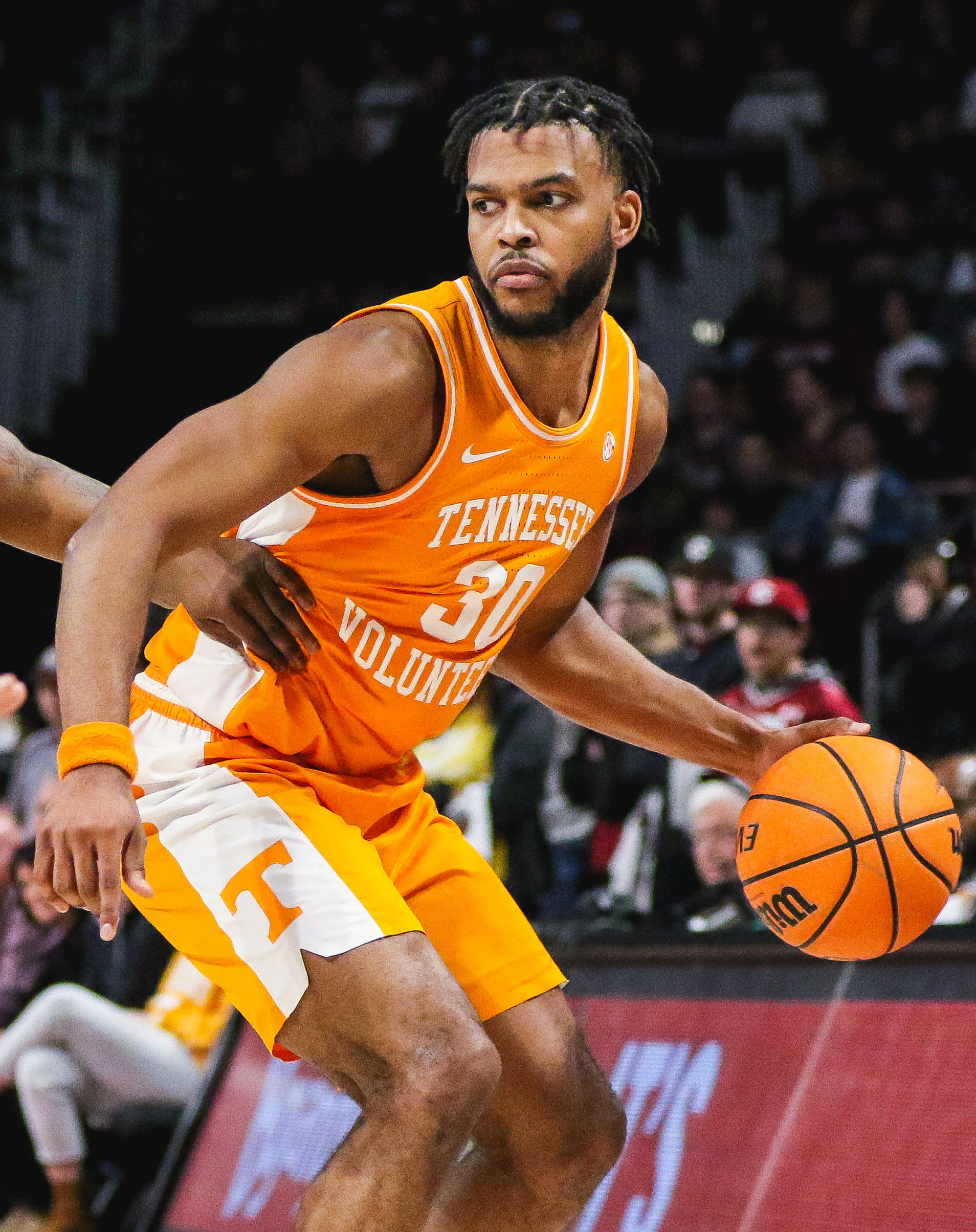
- James with Tennessee in 2022

No. 30 – New Zealand Breakers
- Position: Forward
- League: NBL

Personal information
- Born: September 5, 2000 (age 26) Charleston, South Carolina, U.S.
- Listed height: 6 ft 6 in (1.98 m)
- Listed weight: 214 lb (97 kg)

Career information
- High school: Porter-Gaud School (Charleston, South Carolina)
- College: Tennessee (2019–2024)
- NBA draft: 2024: undrafted
- Playing career: 2024–present

Career history
- 2024–2025: Indiana Mad Ants
- 2025–2026: Hapoel Jerusalem
- 2026–present: New Zealand Breakers

Career highlights
- McDonald's All-American (2019); South Carolina Mr. Basketball (2019)
- Stats at NBA.com
- Stats at Basketball Reference
Medals
Men's basketball
Representing the United States
FIBA Americas U18 Championship
Gold medal – first place	2018 Canada	Team

Josiah-Jordan James (born September 5, 2000) is an American professional basketball player for the New Zealand Breakers of the Australian National Basketball League (NBL). He played college basketball for the Tennessee Volunteers.

== High school career ==
James played high school basketball for Porter-Gaud School in Charleston, South Carolina. He was named Gatorade Player of the Year in South Carolina after averaging 29.1 points, 12.4 rebounds, 5.3 blocks and 4.9 assists per game. James led the team to three state titles. He set Porter-Gaud's single game scoring record with 45 points in the Cyclones’ 84–49 win against Northwood Academy. He was named a McDonald's All-American.

=== Recruiting ===
James was considered a five-star recruit by Rivals and ESPN and a four-star recruit by 247Sports. On September 19, 2018, he committed to play college basketball for Tennessee over offers from Clemson, Duke, and Michigan State.

College recruiting
Name	Hometown	School	Height	Weight	Commit date
Josiah-Jordan James; PG	Charleston, SC	Porter-Gaud School (SC)	6 ft 6 in (1.98 m)	200 lb (91 kg)	Sep 19, 2018
Josiah-Jordan James; PG	Recruit ratings: Rivals: 247Sports: ESPN: (90)				
Overall recruit ranking: Rivals: 18 247Sports: 29 ESPN: 26
Note: In many cases, Scout, Rivals, 247Sports, On3, and ESPN may conflict in their listings of height and weight.; In these cases, the average was taken. ESPN grades are on a 100-point scale.; Sources: "Tennessee 2019 Basketball Commitments". Rivals.; "2019 Tennessee Volunteers Recruiting Class". ESPN.; "2019 Team Ranking". Rivals.

== College career ==
James missed much of the preseason with a hip injury. He scored seven points in Tennessee's first two games. In a 75–62 win over Washington, James finished with nine points, five assists and four rebounds. On January 4, 2020, James scored a career-high 15 points on 5-of-11 shooting in a 78–64 loss to LSU. He was ruled out with a hip injury on January 30. As a freshman, James averaged 7.4 points, 5.5 rebounds, and 2.9 assists per game. On January 30, 2021, he suffered a wrist injury against Kansas, forcing him to miss two games. As a sophomore, James averaged 8.0 points and a team-leading 6.5 rebounds per game. He underwent wrist surgery in the offseason.

James averaged 10.3 points and 6.0 rebounds per game as a junior. As a senior, he battled injuries but averaged 10 points and 4.7 rebounds per game. James opted to return for his fifth season of eligibility. In his fifth season, he averaged 8.4 points and 6.4 rebounds per game.

== Professional career ==
=== Indiana Mad Ants (2024–2025) ===
After going undrafted in the 2024 NBA draft, James signed with the Indiana Pacers on September 27, 2024, but waived him two days later. On October 27, he joined the Indiana Mad Ants.

=== Hapoel Jerusalem (2025–2026) ===
On July 29, 2025, James signed with Hapoel Jerusalem of the Israeli Basketball Premier League and EuroCup. He averaged 9.4 points in eight games in 2025–26.

=== New Zealand Breakers (2026–present) ===
On July 30, 2026, James signed with the New Zealand Breakers of the Australian National Basketball League (NBL) for the 2026–27 season. On September 16, 2026, he was ruled out for at least the first four weeks of the season with a left hamstring injury.

== National team career ==
James played for the United States under-18 basketball team at the 2018 FIBA Under-18 Americas Championship. He helped his team win the gold medal.

== Career statistics ==
Legend
GP	Games played	GS	Games started	MPG	Minutes per game
FG%	Field goal percentage	3P%	3-point field goal percentage	FT%	Free throw percentage
RPG	Rebounds per game	APG	Assists per game	SPG	Steals per game
BPG	Blocks per game	PPG	Points per game	**Bold**	Career high

=== College ===
Year	Team	GP	GS	MPG	FG%	3P%	FT%	RPG	APG	SPG	BPG	PPG
2019–20	Tennessee	27	26	**29.9**	.370	**.367**	.778	5.5	**2.9**	.9	.9	7.4
2020–21	Tennessee	25	17	27.0	.390	.308	.778	**6.5**	2.0	**1.4**	1.0	8.0
2021–22	Tennessee	32	30	29.0	.388	.324	.800	6.0	1.7	**1.4**	**1.1**	**10.3**
2022–23	Tennessee	24	14	25.2	.372	.313	**.861**	4.7	1.8	1.2	.1	10.0
2023–24	Tennessee	**36**	**36**	29.2	**.402**	.341	.831	6.4	1.9	**1.4**	.6	8.4
Career		144	123	28.2	.385	.328	.809	5.9	2.1	1.3	0.8	8.8
