= Tyreke Key =

American basketball player (born 1998)

No. 5 – Raptors 905
- Position: Point guard / shooting guard
- League: NBA G League

Personal information
- Born: October 29, 1998 (age 28) Celina, Tennessee, U.S.
- Listed height: 6 ft 2 in (1.88 m)
- Listed weight: 207 lb (94 kg)

Career information
- High school: Clay County (Celina, Tennessee)
- College: Indiana State (2017–2022); Tennessee (2022–2023)
- NBA draft: 2023: undrafted
- Playing career: 2023–present

Career history
- 2023–2024: Leuven Bears
- 2024–present: Raptors 905

Career highlights
- 2× First-team All-MVC (2020, 2021); Second-team All-MVC (2019); MVC All-Freshman Team (2018); Tennessee Mr. Basketball (2017)
- Stats at NBA.com
- Stats at Basketball Reference

Tyreke Deon Key (born October 29, 1998) is an American professional basketball player for the Raptors 905 of the NBA G League. Key played college basketball for the Indiana State Sycamores and the Tennessee Volunteers.

== High school career ==
Key attended Clay County High school. As a senior, Key averaged a state leading 37.3 points per game. He scored 1,383 total points, breaking the 25 year old record held by Tony Delk (1,312). Key was named an All-State selection, Class A Mr. Basketball, and the Class A Most Valuable Player. Key set state tournament records for most points in a game (54) and most points in a single tournament (128). Key finished his high school career with 3,287 total points, 10th most in the history of Tennessee.

== College career ==
Key began his college career at Indiana State. As a freshman in 2017-18, Key averaged 8.3 points, 1.5 assists, and 4.2 rebounds per game. Key was named to the 2018 MVC All-Freshman Team.

During his sophomore season in 2018-19, Key started all 31 games. He averaged a conference leading 17.4 points per game. He also averaged 3.5 rebounds and 1.7 assists per game. He played the most minutes per game in the conference at 34.4. Key was named Second-Team All-MVC, MVC Most Improved Team, and NABC All-District Second-Team.

In Key's junior season in 2019-20, Key started and played in 30 games. He averaged 15.6 points, 4.6 rebounds, and 1.7 assists per game. He was named First-Team All-MVC.

As a senior during the 2020-21 season, Key Averaged 17.2 points, 4.4 rebounds, and 2.0 assists per game. He led the MVC in minutes played per game for the second time at 34.0. Key scored a career high 34 points against Evansville on February 17, 2021. Key dealt with a right shoulder injury that occurred during the previous season. He had multiple subluxations which resulted in him missing multiple games at the end of his senior year. Key returned to play in the Missouri Valley Conference Tournament. Key was named First-Team All-MVC.

On November 8th, 2021, it was announced that Key would miss the entire 2021-2022 season with right shoulder surgery. It was reported that Key had been playing with pain on and off since the original injury in 2020. After Key subluxed his shoulder for the third time at the end of October in 2021, he opted to have surgery to fix the injury.

Key entered the NCAA Transfer Portal on March 16, 2022 and signed with the University of Tennessee on April 26, 2022. As a graduate student for the 2022-23 season, Key averaged 8.2 points, 2.5 rebounds, and 1.3 assists per game.

== Professional career ==
=== Leuven Bears (2023–2024) ===
Key went undrafted in the 2023 NBA draft. On May 31, 2023, he signed to play with the Leuven Bears of Belgium. As a rookie, Key averaged 19.4 points, 3.4 rebounds, and 2.9 assists per game.

=== Raptors 905 (2024–2026) ===
On September 10, 2025, Key signed an Exhibit-10 contract with the Toronto Raptors. He was assigned to the Raptors 905 of the NBA G League after failing to make Toronto's roster for Opening Night.

On April 6, 2026, the Raptors announced that they had signed Key to a rest-of-season contract. However, on April 10, Key was waived by Toronto without having appeared in an NBA game.

== Career statistics ==
Legend
GP	Games played	GS	Games started	MPG	Minutes per game
FG%	Field goal percentage	3P%	3-point field goal percentage	FT%	Free throw percentage
RPG	Rebounds per game	APG	Assists per game	SPG	Steals per game
BPG	Blocks per game	PPG	Points per game	**Bold**	Career high

=== College ===
Year	Team	GP	GS	MPG	FG%	3P%	FT%	RPG	APG	SPG	BPG	PPG
2017–18	Indiana State	30	13	28.1	.360	.324	.716	4.2	1.5	.9	.3	8.3
2018–19	Indiana State	31	**31**	**34.3**	**.525**	**.448**	.787	3.5	1.7	**1.1**	.1	**17.4**
2019–20	Indiana State	30	30	33.3	.449	.389	**.846**	4.6	1.7	.7	.2	15.6
2020–21	Indiana State	23	23	33.9	.472	.316	.838	**5.3**	**2.0**	**1.1**	**.4**	17.2
2022–23	Tennessee	**33**	15	24.2	.333	.374	.741	1.3	.3	.7	.1	8.2
Career		147	112	30.5	.439	.364	.794	4.0	1.6	.9	.2	13.1
