= Doug Roth =

American basketball player

Personal information
- Born: August 24, 1967 (age 59) Knoxville, Tennessee, U. S.
- Listed height: 6 ft 11 in (2.11 m)
- Listed weight: 255 lb (116 kg)

Career information
- High school: Karns (Karns, Tennessee)
- College: Tennessee (1985–1989)
- NBA draft: 1989: 2nd round, 41st overall pick
- Drafted by: Washington Bullets
- Playing career: 1989–1994
- Position: Center
- Number: 13

Career history
- 1989–1990: Washington Bullets
- 1991–1992: Louisville Shooters
- 1992–1994: Gießen 46ers

Career highlights
- McDonald's All-American (1985); Second-team Parade All-American (1985)
- Stats at NBA.com
- Stats at Basketball Reference

Douglas Keith Roth (born August 24, 1967) is an American former professional basketball player who was selected by the Washington Bullets in the second round (41st pick overall) of the 1989 NBA draft and played one season in the National Basketball Association (NBA).

== College career ==
A 6'11" center from Knoxville, Tennessee, Roth played college basketball at the University of Tennessee. He played four seasons for the Volunteers from 1985 until 1989. At Tennessee, Roth played alongside several future NBA players, including Tony White, Dyron Nix, and Ian Lockhart.

== Professional career ==
Roth played in one National Basketball Association (NBA) season for the Bullets, appearing in 42 games during the 1989–90 season.
