= Lamonte Turner =

American basketball player (born 1997)

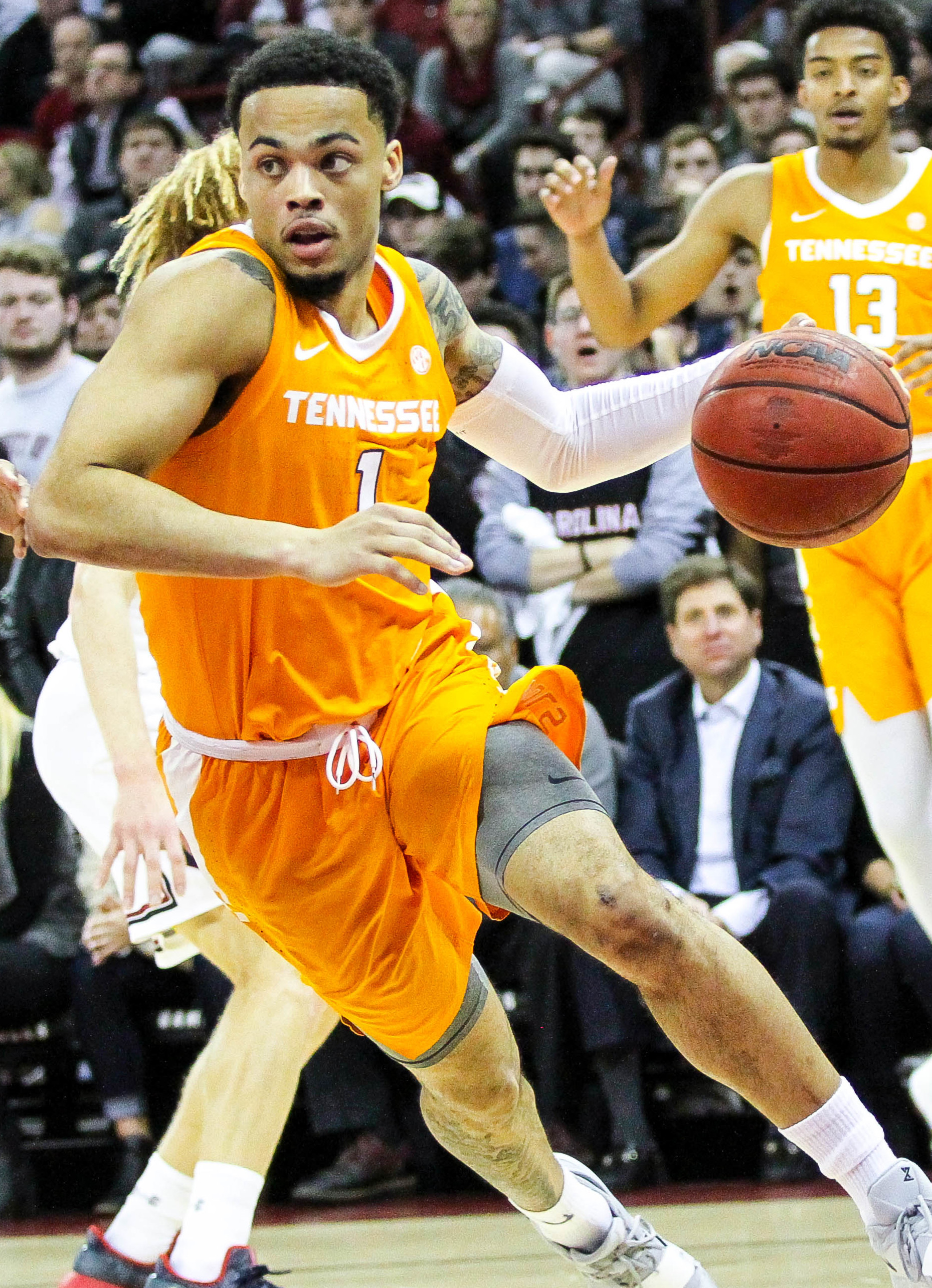
- Turner in January 2019

JS Kairouan
- Position: Point guard
- League: Championnat Pro A

Personal information
- Born: July 4, 1997 (age 29) Florence, Alabama, U.S.
- Listed height: 6 ft 2 in (1.88 m)
- Listed weight: 187 lb (85 kg)

Career information
- High school: Sparkman (Harvest, Alabama); IMG Academy (Bradenton, Florida)
- College: Tennessee (2016–2020)
- NBA draft: 2020: undrafted
- Playing career: 2021–present

Career history
- 2021: Arka Gdynia
- 2022: Terme Olimia Podcetrtek
- 2022–2023: Kataja BC
- 2023: FMP
- 2024: Dynamic
- 2026–present: JS Kairouan

Career highlights
- SEC Sixth Man of the Year (2018)

Lamonte Centerius Turner (born July 4, 1997) is an American professional basketball player for JS Kairouan of the Championnat Pro A. He played college basketball for the Tennessee Volunteers.

== High school career ==
Turner played high school basketball for Sparkman High School in Harvest, Alabama. As a junior he averaged 13 points, 5.5 rebounds and four assists per game, helping lead the Senators to a 29–8 record and the Class 6A state championship game. Turner transferred to IMG Academy in Bradenton, Florida. He was ranked the No. 56 overall prospect in the Class of 2016 according to Rivals. Turner reclassified to 2015 and signed with Tennessee on April 28, 2015, choosing the Volunteers over offers from Florida, Florida State, Louisville, Wichita State, Alabama and Auburn.

== College career ==
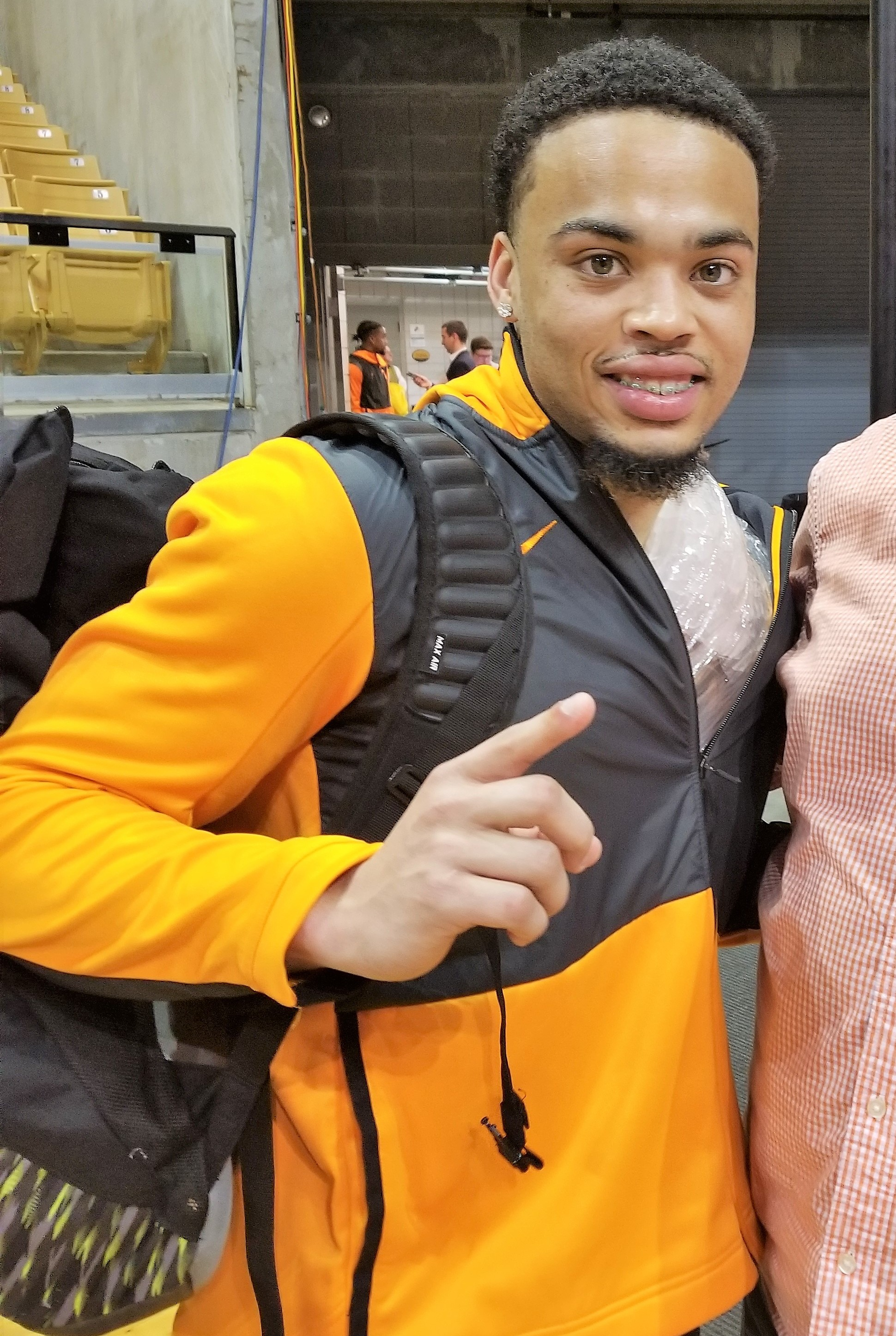
Turner in January 2019

Turner was forced to redshirt his freshman season. He averaged 8.2 points, 2.5 rebounds and 2.7 assists per game as a redshirt freshman starting half of his 32 games. As a sophomore, Turner averaged 10.9 points, 3.2 rebounds and 2.2 assists per game, shooting 39.9 percent from the field and 39.5 percent from behind the three-point line. He was named SEC Sixth Man of the Year. He averaged 11.0 points and 3.8 assists per game as a junior on a team that reached the Sweet 16. He dealt with shoulder soreness during the beginning of the season. Coming into his senior season, Turner was named to the Bob Cousy Award watchlist. He had 13 points in a win over Alabama State on November 20 and surpassed the 1,000 point threshold. On November 30, 2019, Turner hit a buzzer-beating three-pointer from the corner to give Tennessee a 72–69 win over VCU in the Emerald Classic. As a senior, Turner averaged 12.3 points and 7.1 assists per game in 11 games but struggled with his shooting, hitting 23.4 percent of his three-pointers. Following a win against Jacksonville State on December 21, 2019, Turner announced that he would have season-ending shoulder surgery.

== Professional career ==
In September 2021, Turner signed his first professional contract with Arka Gdynia of the Polish Basketball League. He left Arka Gdynia after appearing in three games.

Turner started the 2022–23 season in Slovenia with Terme Olimia Podcetrtek and then joined Finnish club Kataja BC in November 2022, where he averaged 15.6 points, 5.2 assists, and 3.4 rebounds per game.

In June 2023, Turner signed with FMP of the Basketball League of Serbia and the Adriatic League. He left FMP after appearing in two games. In February 2024, he joined Dynamic.

On January 5, 2025, Turner signed with the Sydney Kings of the Australian National Basketball League (NBL) for the rest of the 2024–25 season. However, four days later, his contract was voided by the Kings after he failed a team physical.

On November 1, 2026, Turner signed with JS Kairouan of the Championnat Pro A.

== Career statistics ==
Legend
GP	Games played	GS	Games started	MPG	Minutes per game
FG%	Field goal percentage	3P%	3-point field goal percentage	FT%	Free throw percentage
RPG	Rebounds per game	APG	Assists per game	SPG	Steals per game
BPG	Blocks per game	PPG	Points per game	**Bold**	Career high

=== College ===
Year	Team	GP	GS	MPG	FG%	3P%	FT%	RPG	APG	SPG	BPG	PPG
2015–16	Tennessee	Redshirt										
2016–17	Tennessee	32	6	20.7	.355	.328	.769	2.5	2.7	.6	**.2**	8.2
2017–18	Tennessee	**35**	0	25.3	.399	**.395**	**.882**	3.2	2.2	.7	.1	10.9
2018–19	Tennessee	28	**19**	31.0	**.420**	.320	.784	2.7	3.8	1.3	.1	10.9
2019–20	Tennessee	11	11	**33.7**	.310	.234	.746	**3.5**	**7.1**	**1.8**	**.2**	**12.3**
Career		106	36	26.3	.382	.341	.801	2.9	3.3	.9	.1	10.2
