= Rick Barnes =

American basketball coach (born 1954)

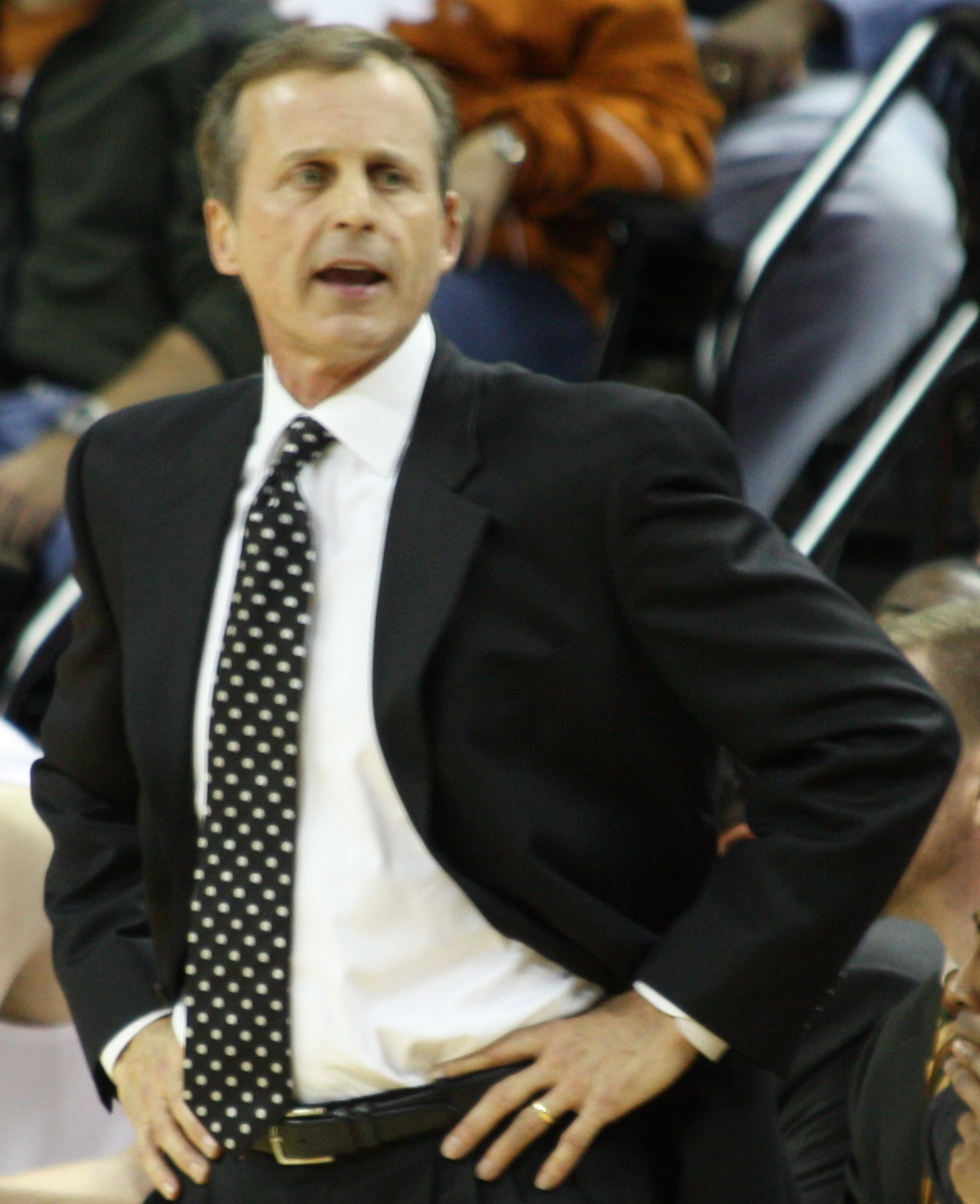
- Barnes in 2009

Current position
- Title: Head coach
- Team: Tennessee
- Conference: SEC
- Record: 262–121 (.684)

Biographical details
- Born: July 17, 1954 (age 72); Hickory, North Carolina, U.S.

Playing career
- 1974–1977: Lenoir–Rhyne

Coaching career (HC unless noted)
- 1977–1978: North State Academy (assistant)
- 1978–1980: Davidson (assistant)
- 1980–1985: George Mason (assistant)
- 1985–1986: Alabama (assistant)
- 1986–1987: Ohio State (assistant)
- 1987–1988: George Mason
- 1988–1994: Providence
- 1994–1998: Clemson
- 1998–2015: Texas
- 2015–present: Tennessee

Head coaching record
- Overall: 866–435 (.666)
- Tournaments: 36–28 (NCAA Division I); 5–4 (NIT); 0–1 (CBI)

Accomplishments and honors

Championships
- NCAA Division I tournament Final Four (2003); Big East tournament (1994); 3 Big 12 regular season (1999, 2006, 2008); SEC tournament (2022); 2 SEC regular season (2018, 2024)

Awards
- Naismith Coach of the Year (2019); Henry Iba Award (2019); Coach Wooden "Keys to Life" Award (2018); CAA Coach of the Year (1988); 4× Big 12 Coach of the Year (1999, 2003, 2008, 2014); SEC Coach of the Year (2018); John R. Wooden Legends of Coaching Award (2009)

Richard Barnes (born July 17, 1954) is an American college basketball coach who is currently the head coach at the University of Tennessee. He is also known for coaching at the University of Texas from 1998 to 2015, taking the team to the NCAA Division I men's basketball tournament in 16 of his 17 seasons — including 14 straight from 1999 to 2012 — as well as a Final Four appearance in 2003. Barnes also previously coached at George Mason University, Providence College, and Clemson University. He has an overall record of 28–26 (.519) in the NCAA tournament (including 19–16 while at Texas).

== Early life ==
Barnes was born on July 17, 1954, and grew up in Hickory, North Carolina. He is a 1977 graduate of Lenoir-Rhyne University where he was a member of the men's basketball team.

== Coaching career ==
Barnes served as an assistant under Eddie Biedenbach at Davidson for two seasons and one with Wimp Sanderson at Alabama.

Prior to coaching at Texas, Barnes coached at George Mason, Providence, and Clemson. At Providence, Fran Fraschilla served as his assistant coach. Barnes advanced to three NCAA tournaments at Providence and three consecutive at Clemson before leaving for Texas in 1998. Barnes won his first post-season conference tournament championship in 1994, while at Providence. At Clemson, his Tigers spent one week of the 1996–97 season ranked second in the AP Poll, the highest ranking in school history.

=== Texas ===
Barnes was hired by Texas in April 1998, and the basketball program immediately displayed his impact. Despite playing with just seven scholarship players for the majority of the 1998–99 season and opening the season with a 3–8 record, the Longhorns won 16 of their final 21 games, winning the regular season Big 12 conference championship by a two-game margin, and finishing the year at 19–13 and qualifying for the NCAA Tournament.

Barnes' success at Texas, a traditional football powerhouse, sparked interest in college basketball at the university and throughout the state. At Texas, Barnes won a school-record 402 games and transformed the school into one of the top college basketball programs in the nation. He guided the Longhorns to 16 NCAA tournament appearances. They reached the Final Four in 2003, their first in over 50 years, and advanced to the Elite Eight in 2006 and 2008. He also led Texas to their first #1 ranking in 2010, and led the Longhorns to the first 30-win seasons in school history. He coached two national players of the year: T. J. Ford (2003) and Kevin Durant (2007). He also won four Big 12 Coach of the Year awards (1999, 2003, 2008, 2014) during his time in Austin, establishing himself as a nationally regarded coach. He was fired in 2015 after Texas failed to advance to the Sweet 16 for the seventh straight season.

=== Tennessee ===
Barnes was hired by the Tennessee Volunteers in 2015. He was the Vols' third coach in as many seasons. Cuonzo Martin had left for California after the 2013–14 season; his successor, Donnie Tyndall, had been fired after just one season for lying about NCAA violations at his previous stop, Southern Mississippi.

Barnes increased the Vols' win total in each of his first four seasons. In 2018, he was named Southeastern Conference Coach of the Year after leading the Volunteers to a share of their first regular-season SEC title in a decade and a spot in the conference championship game, earning his sixth-career conference coach of the year award.

In 2018–19, he was named the Naismith College Coach of the Year after the Vols finished 31–6 (tying a school record for wins in a season) and reached the Sweet 16 of the NCAA Tournament. They were ranked No. 1 for several weeks during the season, only the second time that the Vols have been ranked that high. He coached Grant Williams in his All-American season. Williams was Tennessee's first player to be named a first-team All American since Dale Ellis in the 1982–83 season.

In the 2019–20 season, Barnes won his 700th game as a head coach with a victory over Jacksonville State. In the 2021–22 season, Barnes led Tennessee to their first SEC Tournament title since the 1978–79 season.

In the 2023–24 season, Barnes earned his 800th career win as a head coach in a victory over Texas A&M. The Volunteers won the SEC regular season outright for the sixth time in school history. He led Tennessee to their first Elite 8 appearance since the 2010 NCAA Tournament.

In the 2024–25 season, Barnes led the Volunteers to another Elite 8. The Volunteers' season ended with a loss to Houston.

In the 2025–26 season, Barnes led the Volunteers to a third consecutive Elite 8. The Volunteers' season ended with a loss to Michigan.

== Personal life ==
He has two children with his wife Candy. His son is a missionary overseas. His daughter, Carley, lives in Texas.

Barnes is a Christian. He has said, “I’m just thankful that God, you know, He won’t let go of you. I don’t think there’s any question He had me when I was young, but I let the world take me down a road and roads that I shouldn’t have gone. But I believe that once He gets a hold of you, He won’t let you go. I think He has great plans to help me become more and more like Him every day.” He has also said, “Honestly, I just think the biggest thing is that we should want to share our faith. We should want our players to understand who Jesus Christ is. They should see us living that every single day.”

In 2007, Barnes made a cameo appearance in the NBC television series Friday Night Lights as a recruiter for the fictional school TMU.

== Head coaching record ==
Record table
| Season | Team | Overall | Conference | Standing | Postseason |
|---|---|---|---|---|---|
George Mason Patriots (Colonial Athletic Association) (1987–1988)
| 1987–88 | George Mason | 20–10 | 9–5 | T–2nd | |
| George Mason: | | 20–10 (.667) | 9–5 (.643) | | |
Providence Friars (Big East Conference) (1988–1994)
| 1988–89 | Providence | 18–11 | 7–9 | T–6th | NCAA Division I Round of 64 |
| 1989–90 | Providence | 17–12 | 8–8 | T–6th | NCAA Division I Round of 64 |
| 1990–91 | Providence | 19–13 | 7–9 | T–7th | NIT Quarterfinal |
| 1991–92 | Providence | 14–17 | 6–12 | 9th | |
| 1992–93 | Providence | 20–13 | 9–9 | T–4th | NIT Semifinal |
| 1993–94 | Providence | 20–10 | 10–8 | T–4th | NCAA Division I Round of 64 |
| Providence: | | 108–76 (.587) | 47–55 (.461) | | |
Clemson Tigers (Atlantic Coast Conference) (1994–1998)
| 1994–95 | Clemson | 15–13 | 5–11 | T–6th | NIT First Round |
| 1995–96 | Clemson | 18–11 | 7–9 | 6th | NCAA Division I Round of 64 |
| 1996–97 | Clemson | 23–10 | 9–7 | 4th | NCAA Division I Sweet 16 |
| 1997–98 | Clemson | 18–14 | 7–9 | T–4th | NCAA Division I Round of 64 |
| Clemson: | | 74–48 (.607) | 28–36 (.438) | | |
Texas Longhorns (Big 12 Conference) (1998–2015)
| 1998–99 | Texas | 19–13 | 13–3 | 1st | NCAA Division I Round of 64 |
| 1999–00 | Texas | 24–9 | 13–3 | 2nd | NCAA Division I Round of 32 |
| 2000–01 | Texas | 25–9 | 12–4 | T–2nd | NCAA Division I Round of 64 |
| 2001–02 | Texas | 22–12 | 10–6 | T–3rd | NCAA Division I Sweet 16 |
| 2002–03 | Texas | 26–7 | 13–3 | 2nd | NCAA Division I Final Four |
| 2003–04 | Texas | 25–8 | 12–4 | T–2nd | NCAA Division I Sweet 16 |
| 2004–05 | Texas | 20–11 | 9–7 | T–5th | NCAA Division I Round of 64 |
| 2005–06 | Texas | 30–7 | 13–3 | T–1st | NCAA Division I Elite Eight |
| 2006–07 | Texas | 25–10 | 12–4 | 3rd | NCAA Division I Round of 32 |
| 2007–08 | Texas | 31–7 | 13–3 | T–1st | NCAA Division I Elite Eight |
| 2008–09 | Texas | 23–12 | 9–7 | T–4th | NCAA Division I Round of 32 |
| 2009–10 | Texas | 24–10 | 9–7 | T–6th | NCAA Division I Round of 64 |
| 2010–11 | Texas | 28–8 | 13–3 | 2nd | NCAA Division I Round of 32 |
| 2011–12 | Texas | 20–14 | 9–9 | 5th | NCAA Division I Round of 64 |
| 2012–13 | Texas | 16–18 | 7–11 | 7th | CBI First Round |
| 2013–14 | Texas | 24–11 | 11–7 | T–3rd | NCAA Division I Round of 32 |
| 2014–15 | Texas | 20–14 | 8–10 | T–6th | NCAA Division I Round of 64 |
| Texas: | | 402–180 (.691) | 186–94 (.664) | | |
Tennessee Volunteers (Southeastern Conference) (2015–present)
| 2015–16 | Tennessee | 15–19 | 6–12 | 12th | |
| 2016–17 | Tennessee | 16–16 | 8–10 | T–9th | |
| 2017–18 | Tennessee | 26–9 | 13–5 | T–1st | NCAA Division I Round of 32 |
| 2018–19 | Tennessee | 31–6 | 15–3 | T–2nd | NCAA Division I Sweet 16 |
| 2019–20 | Tennessee | 17–14 | 9–9 | T–8th | Postseason cancelled due to COVID-19 |
| 2020–21 | Tennessee | 18–9 | 10–7 | 4th | NCAA Division I Round of 64 |
| 2021–22 | Tennessee | 27–8 | 14–4 | T–2nd | NCAA Division I Round of 32 |
| 2022–23 | Tennessee | 25–11 | 11–7 | T–4th | NCAA Division I Sweet 16 |
| 2023–24 | Tennessee | 27–9 | 14–4 | 1st | NCAA Division I Elite Eight |
| 2024–25 | Tennessee | 30–8 | 12–6 | 4th | NCAA Division I Elite Eight |
| 2025–26 | Tennessee | 25–12 | 11–7 | T–4th | NCAA Division I Elite Eight |
| 2026–27 | Tennessee | 5–0 | 0–0 | | |
| Tennessee: | | 262–121 (.684) | 122–73 (.626) | | |
| Total: | | 866–435 (.666) | | | |
National champion Postseason invitational champion Conference regular season champion Conference regular season and conference tournament champion Division regular season champion Division regular season and conference tournament champion Conference tournament champion

== See also ==
- List of college men's basketball coaches with 600 wins
- List of NCAA Division I Men's Final Four appearances by coach
