= Kyle Alexander =

Canadian basketball player (born 1996)

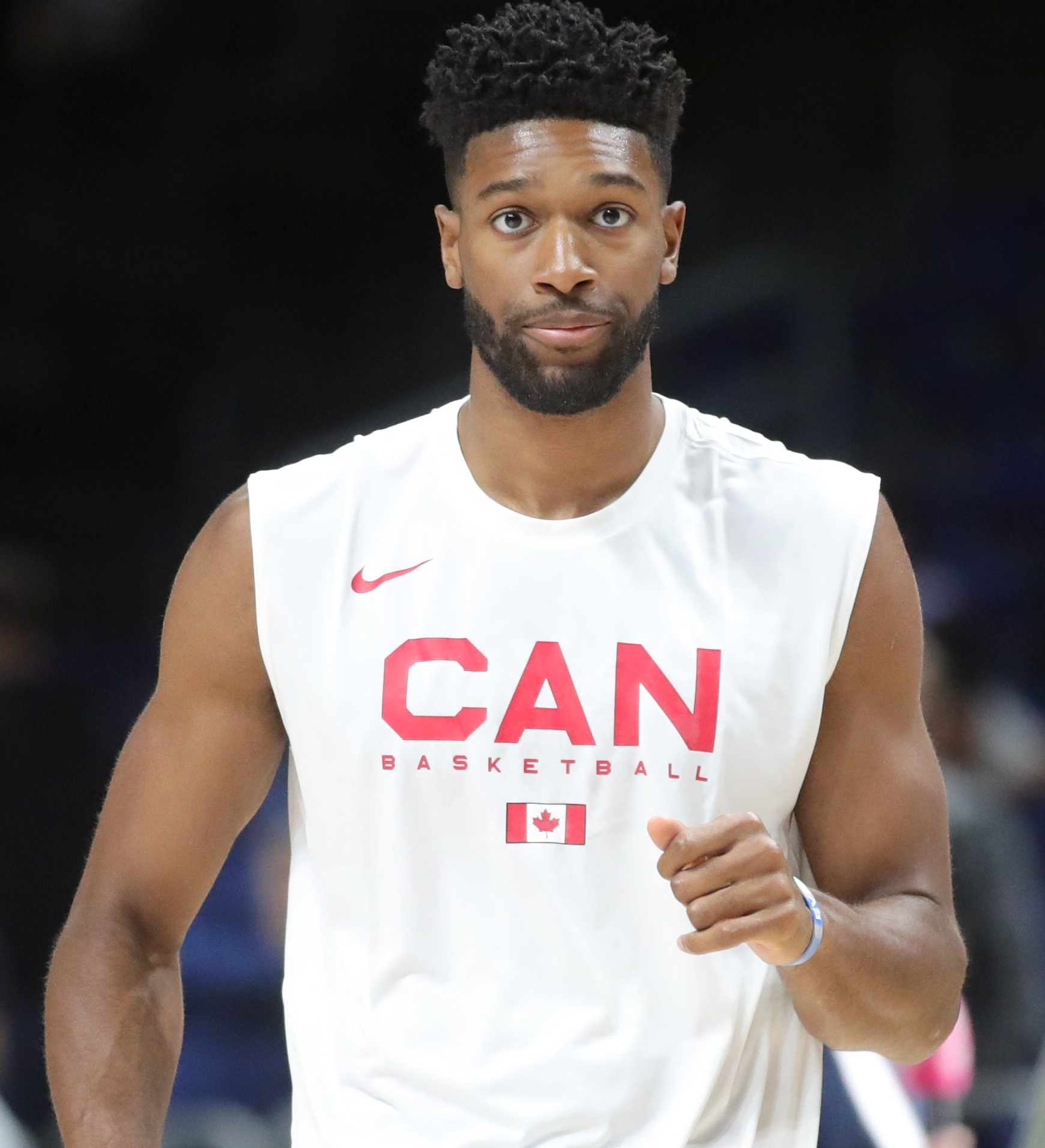
- Alexander with Canada in 2023

No. 8 – PAOK Thessaloniki
- Position: Centre / power forward
- League: Greek Basketball League; EuroCup

Personal information
- Born: October 21, 1996 (age 30) Scarborough, Ontario, Canada
- Listed height: 6 ft 10 in (2.08 m)
- Listed weight: 220 lb (100 kg)

Career information
- High school: Milton District (Milton, Ontario); Orangeville Prep (Orangeville, Ontario)
- College: Tennessee (2015–2019)
- NBA draft: 2019: undrafted
- Playing career: 2019–present

Career history
- 2019–2020: Sioux Falls Skyforce
- 2020: Miami Heat
- 2020: →Sioux Falls Skyforce
- 2020–2022: Fuenlabrada
- 2022: Scarborough Shooting Stars
- 2022–2023: Valencia
- 2023–2024: Hapoel Tel Aviv
- 2024–2026: Türk Telekom
- 2026–present: PAOK Thessaloniki

Career highlights
- EuroCup blocks leader (2025)
- Stats at NBA.com
- Stats at Basketball Reference
Medals
Men's basketball
Representing Canada
FIBA World Cup
Bronze medal – third place	2023 Philippines–Japan–Indonesia

Kyle John Solomon Alexander (born October 21, 1996) is a Canadian professional basketball player for PAOK Thessaloniki of the Greek Basketball League (GBL) and the EuroCup. He played college basketball for the Tennessee Volunteers.

== High school career ==
Alexander was born in Scarborough, Ontario. He grew up in Milton, Ontario, and attended Orangeville Prep in Orangeville, Ontario, where he played soccer and volleyball before picking up basketball in grade 11. He became roommates with Denver Nuggets guard Jamal Murray. Alexander played AAU basketball with the CIA Bounce, teaming up with Murray.

== College career ==
Alexander played college basketball for the Tennessee Volunteers for four years. As a senior, he averaged 7.3 points, 6.6 rebounds, 1.7 blocks and 23.8 minutes per game. He helped lead the team to the Sweet Sixteen, shooting 61.4 percent from the field and 42.9 percent from three-point range.

== Professional career ==
=== Sioux Falls Skyforce (2019–2020) ===
After going undrafted in the 2019 NBA draft, Alexander joined the Miami Heat for the 2019 NBA Summer League. On July 15, 2019, he was signed by the Heat to a training camp contract. Following training camp, Alexander was added to the roster of the Heat's NBA G League affiliate, the Sioux Falls Skyforce.

=== Miami Heat (2020) ===
On January 15, 2020, Alexander signed a two-way contract with the Miami Heat. The following day, it was announced that he was sidelined with a knee injury. He made his NBA debut on August 6, 2020, where he played one minute off the bench and recorded one rebound in a 130–116 loss to the Milwaukee Bucks. The Heat reached the 2020 NBA Finals, but lost in 6 games to the Los Angeles Lakers.

=== Fuenlabrada (2020–2022) ===
On December 2, 2020, Alexander signed with Fuenlabrada of the Spanish Liga ACB. He averaged 9 points and 6.2 rebounds per game. On August 23, 2021, he re-signed with the team.

=== Scarborough Shooting Stars (2022) ===
On May 16, 2022, Alexander signed with the Scarborough Shooting Stars of the CEBL.

=== Valencia (2022–2023) ===
On July 22, 2022, Alexander signed with Valencia of the Spanish Liga ACB. On June 26, 2023, he parted ways with the club.

=== Hapoel Tel Aviv (2023–2024) ===
On July 26, 2023, he signed with Hapoel Tel Aviv of the Israeli Basketball Premier League.

=== Türk Telekom (2024–2026) ===
On July 11, 2024, Alexander signed with Türk Telekom of the Turkish Basketbol Süper Ligi (BSL).

During the 2024–25 EuroCup season, Alexander established himself as one of the competition's leading defensive centers. He led the EuroCup in blocked shots, averaging 2.2 blocks per game, while also recording 6.8 rebounds per game.

On September 10, 2025, Alexander renewed his contract with Türk Telekom for the 2025–26 season. He completed the 2025–26 campaign averaging 9.7 points, 5.7 rebounds, 1.1 assists and 1.1 blocks across 49 appearances in all competitions.

=== PAOK Thessaloniki (2026–present) ===
On June 19, 2026, Alexander signed a two-year contract with PAOK Thessaloniki, keeping him with the club through the end of the 2027–28 season. He joined PAOK as part of the club's roster reconstruction under head coach Andrea Trinchieri, with the club highlighting his athleticism, defensive presence and efficiency as key elements of his game.

Following his signing, Alexander stated that the opportunity to work with Trinchieri was an important factor in his decision to join PAOK, noting that the two had previously come close to working together.

== Career statistics ==
Legend
GP	Games played	GS	Games started	MPG	Minutes per game
FG%	Field goal percentage	3P%	3-point field goal percentage	FT%	Free throw percentage
RPG	Rebounds per game	APG	Assists per game	SPG	Steals per game
BPG	Blocks per game	PPG	Points per game	**Bold**	Career high

=== NBA ===
==== Regular season ====
Year	Team	GP	GS	MPG	FG%	3P%	FT%	RPG	APG	SPG	BPG	PPG
2019–20	Miami	2	0	6.7	.500	–	–	1.5	.0	.0	.0	1.0
Career		2	0	6.7	.500	–	–	1.5	.0	.0	.0	1.0

=== College ===
Year	Team	GP	GS	MPG	FG%	3P%	FT%	RPG	APG	SPG	BPG	PPG
2015–16	Tennessee	32	11	12.2	.432	–	.656	3.2	.1	.2	1.0	1.7
2016–17	Tennessee	32	23	14.0	.466	.167	.500	4.0	.2	.2	1.0	3.3
2017–18	Tennessee	34	34	20.3	**.681**	**1.000**	**.712**	5.6	.3	**.6**	**1.7**	5.6
2018–19	Tennessee	**37**	**37**	**23.8**	.619	.429	.658	**6.7**	**.5**	.5	**1.7**	**7.4**
Career		135	105	17.8	.587	.357	.638	4.9	.3	.3	1.4	4.6

== Personal life ==
Alexander is the son of Joseph and Audrey Alexander. His father Joseph played college basketball for the Niagara Purple Eagles from 1982 to 1986. He has two sisters, named Kayla and Kesia. His sister Kayla is also a professional basketball player and was a member of the Canada women's national basketball team for Team Canada at the 2020 Olympics in Tokyo, and formerly of the Minnesota Lynx of the WNBA.
