= JaJuan Smith =

American basketball player (born 1985)

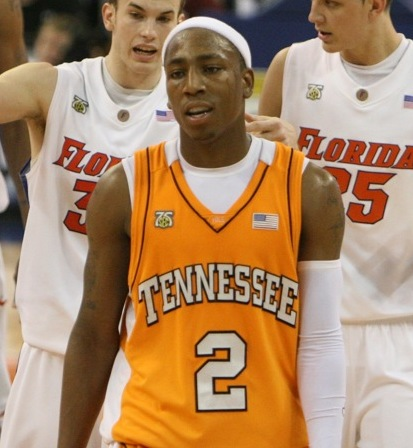

Free agent
- Position: Point guard / shooting guard

Personal information
- Born: December 24, 1985 (age 40) Cleveland, Tennessee
- Listed height: 6 ft 2 in (1.88 m)
- Listed weight: 195 lb (88 kg)

Career information
- High school: McMinn County (Athens, Tennessee)
- College: Tennessee (2004–2008)
- NBA draft: 2008: undrafted
- Playing career: 2008–present

Career history
- 2008–2009: Élan Béarnais Pau-Orthez
- 2009: Minas Tênis Clube
- 2010: Beirasar Rosalía
- 2009–2011: Tulsa 66ers
- 2011: Air21 Express
- 2011–2012: Saint John Mill Rats
- 2012: Selçuk Üniversitesi
- 2012: Tsmoki-Minsk
- 2014–2015: Glasgow Rocks
- 2015: GKK Šibenik
- 2016–2017: Muba Hangtuah Sumatera Selatan

Career highlights
- Honorable-Mention All-SEC – AP (2008)

JaJuan Smith (born December 24, 1985) is an American professional basketball player who last played for Muba Hangtuah Sumatera Selatan of the Indonesian Basketball League. He is an Athens, Tennessee native although he is noted by the press as a Cleveland, Tennessee native.

== College career ==
Smith was a collegiate basketball player who formerly played for the Tennessee Volunteers at the University of Tennessee. He was named All-SEC 2nd Team for the 2007–2008 season.

== Professional career ==
Smith was cut by the NBA club the Dallas Mavericks on October 22, 2008. At the end of October 2008, he signed a contract with the Slovenian League club, Union Olimpija of the Euroleague, through the end of 2008–09 season, but he left the team in less than a week for personal reasons. On December 26, 2008, he signed a short-term contract with French League club Elan Bearnais Pau-Orthez.

In February 2011, JaJuan Smith was signed to play for the Air21 Express in the Philippine Basketball Association.

In September 2014, Smith signed with Glasgow Rocks of the British Basketball League for the 2014–15 season. On January 21, 2015, the Glasgow Rocks announced that JaJuan had left the franchise. On March 24, 2015, he signed with GKK Šibenik of Croatia for the rest of the season.
