= Victor Bailey Jr. =

American basketball player (born 1998)

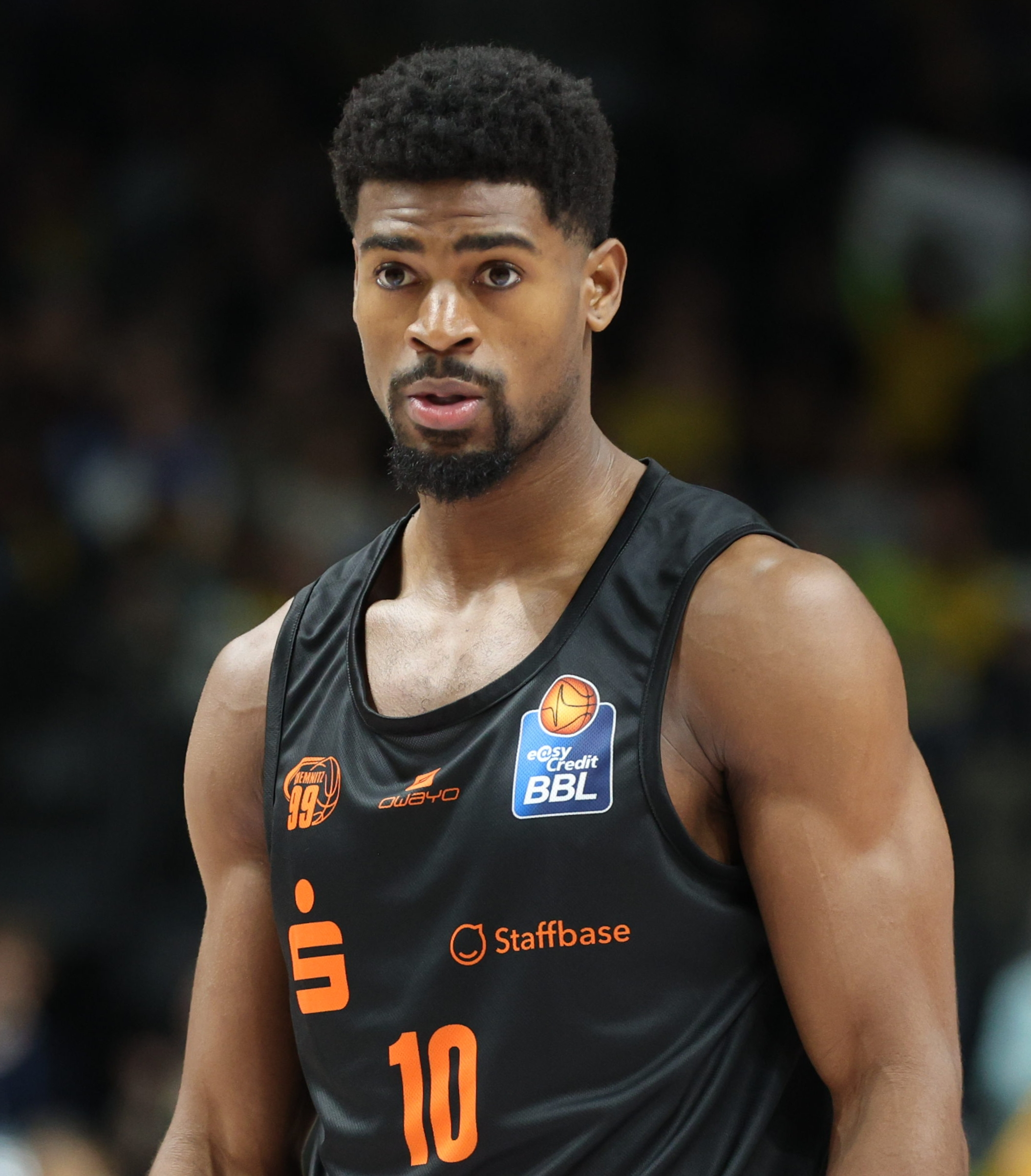
- Bailey in 2024

No. 10 – Yukatel Denizli Basket
- Position: Shooting guard
- League: Basketbol Süper Ligi

Personal information
- Born: September 28, 1998 (age 28) Austin, Texas, U.S.
- Listed height: 6 ft 4 in (1.93 m)
- Listed weight: 179 lb (81 kg)

Career information
- High school: McNeil (Austin, Texas)
- College: ̇Oregon (2017–2020); Tennessee (2020–2022); George Mason (2022–2023)
- Playing career: 2023–present

Career history
- 2023: Leuven Bears
- 2024: PS Karlsruhe Lions
- 2024–2025: NINERS Chemnitz
- 2025: Krka
- 2026: Beijing Ducks
- 2026–present: Denizli Basket

Career highlights
- ProA Finals MVP (2024); ProA Champion (2024)

Victor Lamont Bailey Jr. (born September 28, 1998) is an American professional basketball player for Yukatel Denizli Basket of the Basketbol Süper Ligi (BSL). He played college basketball for the Oregon Ducks, Tennessee Volunteers, and George Mason Patriots.

== Early life and college career ==
Bailey was born in Dallas, Texas and raised in Austin, Texas, and is the son of former NFL wide receiver Victor Bailey Sr. He attended McNeil High School and later played college basketball for Oregon (2017–2020), Tennessee (2020–2022), and George Mason (2022–2023).

== Professional career ==
After going undrafted in the 2023 NBA Draft, Bailey began his professional career with the Leuven Bears in the Belgian BNXT League. He averaged 9.7 points and 1.7 rebounds in 12 games before leaving the team in December 2023.

In early 2024, he signed with the PS Karlsruhe Lions in Germany’s ProA league. Bailey was instrumental in their championship run, averaging 13.3 points and 2.0 rebounds per game, and was named ProA Finals MVP.

He briefly signed with Joensuun Kataja in Finland’s Korisliiga in mid-2024 but did not appear in any official games.

Later in 2024, Bailey joined the NINERS Chemnitz in the German Basketball Bundesliga. For the 2024–25 season, he averaged 15.2 points, 2.6 rebounds, and 1.9 assists per game.

On July 30, 2025, he signed with Krka of the Slovenian League.

On 9 January 2026, he signed with Beijing Ducks of the CBA. On 23 April 2026, Beijing Ducks has announced his departure.

On August 7, 2026, he signed with Yukatel Denizli Basket of the Basketbol Süper Ligi (BSL).

== Career statistics ==
Legend
GP	Games played	GS	Games started	MPG	Minutes per game
FG%	Field goal percentage	3P%	3-point field goal percentage	FT%	Free throw percentage
RPG	Rebounds per game	APG	Assists per game	SPG	Steals per game
BPG	Blocks per game	PPG	Points per game	**Bold**	Career high

=== College ===
Year	Team	GP	GS	MPG	FG%	3P%	FT%	RPG	APG	SPG	BPG	PPG
2017–18	Oregon	36	0	16.6	.418	.364	.870	1.7	0.9	0.4	0.1	6.7
2018–19	Oregon	**37**	8	19.1	.413	.398	**.911**	2.0	0.9	**0.6**	–	7.4
2020–21	Tennessee	27	12	24.8	.402	.338	.828	2.0	**1.6**	**0.6**	0.1	10.9
2021–22	Tennessee	34	4	9.6	.340	.218	.563	0.9	0.5	0.3	0.1	2.6
2022–23	George Mason	24	**20**	**31.7**	**.449**	**.470**	.804	**3.2**	**1.6**	0.4	**0.2**	**11.8**
