= 2020–21 Auburn Tigers men's basketball team =

American college basketball season

2020–21 Auburn Tigers men's basketball
- Conference: Southeastern Conference
- Record: 13–14 (7–11 SEC)
- Head coach: Bruce Pearl (7th season)
- Assistant coaches: Ira Bowman (3rd season); Wes Flanigan (3rd season); Steven Pearl (4th season)
- Home arena: Auburn Arena

2020–21 Southeastern Conference men's basketball standings
	Conf.				Overall
Team	W		L	PCT	W		L	PCT
No. 5 Alabama†	16	–	2	.889	26	–	7	.788
No. 10 Arkansas	13	–	4	.765	25	–	7	.781
LSU	11	–	6	.647	19	–	10	.655
Tennessee	10	–	7	.588	18	–	9	.667
Florida	9	–	7	.563	15	–	10	.600
Ole Miss	10	–	8	.556	16	–	12	.571
Missouri	8	–	8	.500	16	–	10	.615
Kentucky	8	–	9	.471	9	–	16	.360
Mississippi State	8	–	10	.444	18	–	15	.545
Georgia	7	–	11	.389	14	–	12	.538
Auburn^{*}	7	–	11	.389	13	–	14	.481
South Carolina	4	–	12	.250	6	–	15	.286
Texas A&M	2	–	8	.200	8	–	10	.444
Vanderbilt	3	–	13	.188	9	–	16	.360
† 2021 SEC tournament winner^{*} Ineligible for postseason due to self-imposed postseason ban.

The 2020–21 Auburn Tigers men's basketball team represented Auburn University during the 2020–21 NCAA Division I men's basketball season as a member of the Southeastern Conference. The team's head coach is Bruce Pearl in his seventh season at Auburn. The team played their home games at Auburn Arena in Auburn, Alabama.

On November 22, 2020, the team announced a self-imposed, one year postseason ban due to former assistant coach Chuck Person's involvement in the 2017–18 NCAA Division I men's basketball corruption scandal.

== Previous season ==
The 2019–20 Auburn Tigers men's basketball team finished the 2019–20 season 25–6, 12–6 in SEC play. The Tigers earned the No. 2 seed in the SEC tournament, but the tournament was canceled due to the COVID-19 pandemic. The NCAA tournament, in which Auburn was expected to participate, was also cancelled.

== Offseason ==
=== Departures ===
Auburn lost seniors Thomas Collier, Samir Doughty, Will Macoy, J'Von McCormick, Anfernee McLemore, Danjel Purifoy, and Austin Wiley to graduation. In addition, freshman Isaac Okoro declared for the NBA draft and sophomore Myles Parker transferred to Alabama A&M.

Name	Number	Pos.	Height	Weight	Year	Hometown	Notes
Thomas Collier	54	F	6'9"	215	Senior	Birmingham, AL	Graduated
Samir Doughty	10	G	6'4"	195	Senior	Philadelphia, PA	Graduated
Will Macoy	21	G	6'4"	200	Senior	Birmingham, AL	Graduated
J'Von McCormick	5	G	6'0"	185	Senior	New Orleans, LA	Graduated
Anfernee McLemore	24	F	6'7"	220	Senior	Warwick, GA	Graduated
Isaac Okoro	23	F	6'6"	225	Freshman	Powder Springs, GA	Declared for the NBA draft; selected 5th overall by the Cleveland Cavaliers.
Myles Parker	20	F	6'8"	200	Sophomore	Madison, AL	Transferred to Alabama A&M
Danjel Purifoy	3	F	6'7"	230	Senior	Centreville, AL	Graduated
Austin Wiley	50	C	6'11"	250	Senior	Hoover, AL	Graduated

=== 2020 recruiting class ===
College recruiting information
Name	Hometown	School	Height	Weight	Commit date
Justin Powell; SG	Prospect, KY	North Oldham (KY)	6 ft 6 in (1.98 m)	195 lb (88 kg)	Jun 7, 2019
Justin Powell; SG	Recruit ratings: Rivals: 247Sports: ESPN: (83)				
Sharife Cooper; PG	Powder Springs, GA	McEachern (GA)	6 ft 0 in (1.83 m)	160 lb (73 kg)	Sep 27, 2019
Sharife Cooper; PG	Recruit ratings: Rivals: 247Sports: ESPN: (94)				
Chris Moore; PF	West Memphis, AR	West Memphis (AR)	6 ft 7 in (2.01 m)	225 lb (102 kg)	Nov 16, 2019
Chris Moore; PF	Recruit ratings: Rivals: 247Sports: ESPN: (79)				
JT Thor; PF	Anchorage, AK	Norcross (GA)	6 ft 10 in (2.08 m)	195 lb (88 kg)	Apr 12, 2020
JT Thor; PF	Recruit ratings: Rivals: 247Sports: ESPN: (86)				
Dylan Cardwell; C	Augusta, GA	McEachern (GA)	6 ft 10 in (2.08 m)	220 lb (100 kg)	May 7, 2020
Dylan Cardwell; C	Recruit ratings: Rivals: 247Sports: ESPN: (79)				
Overall recruit ranking: Rivals: 6 247Sports: 9 ESPN: 6
Note: In many cases, Scout, Rivals, 247Sports, On3, and ESPN may conflict in their listings of height and weight.; In these cases, the average was taken. ESPN grades are on a 100-point scale.; Sources: "Auburn 2020 Basketball Commitments". Rivals.; "2020 Auburn Tigers Recruiting Class". ESPN.; "2020 Team Ranking". Rivals.

=== 2021 Recruiting class ===
College recruiting information (2021)
Name	Hometown	School	Height	Weight	Commit date
Jabari Smith Jr. PF	Tyrone, GA	Sandy Creek (GA)	6 ft 10 in (2.08 m)	210 lb (95 kg)	Oct 9, 2020
Jabari Smith Jr. PF	Recruit ratings: Rivals: 247Sports: ESPN: (96)				
Overall recruit ranking: Rivals: 40 247Sports: 71 ESPN: 9
Note: In many cases, Scout, Rivals, 247Sports, On3, and ESPN may conflict in their listings of height and weight.; In these cases, the average was taken. ESPN grades are on a 100-point scale.; Sources: "Auburn 2021 Basketball Commitments". Rivals.; "2021 Auburn Tigers Recruiting Class". ESPN.; "2021 Team Ranking". Rivals.

== Preseason ==
=== SEC media poll ===
The SEC media poll was released on November 12, 2020.

Media poll
Predicted finish	Team
1	Tennessee
2	Kentucky
3	LSU
4	Florida
5	Alabama
6	Arkansas
7	Auburn
8	South Carolina
9	Ole Miss
10	Missouri
11	Texas A&M
12	Mississippi State
13	Georgia
14	Vanderbilt

== Roster ==
2020–21 Auburn Tigers men's basketball team
Players
Coaches

Pos.	#	Name	Height	Weight	Year	Previous school	Hometown
G	1	Jamal Johnson	6 ft 4 in (1.93 m)	195 lb (88 kg)	RS Jr	Memphis	Birmingham, AL
G	2	Sharife Cooper	6 ft 1 in (1.85 m)	180 lb (82 kg)	Fr	McEachern	Powder Springs, GA
F	4	Javon Franklin	6 ft 7 in (2.01 m)	220 lb (100 kg)	RS Jr	Holmes CC	Little Rock, AR
F	5	Chris Moore	6 ft 6 in (1.98 m)	240 lb (109 kg)	Fr	West Memphis	West Memphis, AR
F	10	JT Thor	6 ft 10 in (2.08 m)	205 lb (93 kg)	Fr	Norcross	Anchorage, AK
G	12	Lior Berman (W)	6 ft 4 in (1.93 m)	215 lb (98 kg)	So	Mountain Brook	Birmingham, AL
C	13	Babatunde Akingbola	6 ft 10 in (2.08 m)	245 lb (111 kg)	So	McEachern	Ogun, Nigeria
G	14	Preston Cook (W)	6 ft 4 in (1.93 m)	205 lb (93 kg)	Jr	Auburn	Auburn, AL
G	20	Carter Sobera (W)	6 ft 5 in (1.96 m)	187 lb (85 kg)	Fr	Mountain Brook	Birmingham, AL
F	21	Ty Cressman (W)	6 ft 7 in (2.01 m)	244 lb (111 kg)	Fr	Bishop McGuinness	Greensboro, NC
G	22	Allen Flanigan	6 ft 6 in (1.98 m)	215 lb (98 kg)	So	Parkview Magnet	Little Rock, AR
F	23	Jaylin Williams	6 ft 8 in (2.03 m)	230 lb (104 kg)	So	Brantley County	Nahunta, GA
G	24	Justin Powell	6 ft 6 in (1.98 m)	205 lb (93 kg)	Fr	North Oldham	Prospect, KY
G	25	Chandler Leopard (W)	6 ft 3 in (1.91 m)	195 lb (88 kg)	So	Athens	Athens, AL
G	33	Chase Maasdorp (W)	6 ft 0 in (1.83 m)	175 lb (79 kg)	RS So	The Out-of-Door Academy	Lakewood Ranch, FL
G	35	Devan Cambridge	6 ft 6 in (1.98 m)	215 lb (98 kg)	So	Hillcrest Prep	Nashville, TN
C	44	Dylan Cardwell	6 ft 11 in (2.11 m)	250 lb (113 kg)	Fr	McEachern	Augusta, GA

Head coach

- Bruce Pearl (Boston College)

Assistant coach(es)

- Ira Bowman (Penn)
- Wes Flanigan (Auburn)
- Steven Pearl (Tennessee)

Legend

- (C) Team captain
- (S) Suspended
- (I) Ineligible
- (W) Walk-on
- Injured
- Current redshirt

Roster
Last update: November 10, 2020

== Schedule and results ==
Date time, TV	Rank^{#}	Opponent^{#}	Result	Record	High points	High rebounds	High assists	Site (attendance) city, state
Regular season
November 26, 2020*; 3:30 pm, FS1		vs. Saint Joseph's; Fort Myers Tip-Off	W 96–91 ^{OT}	1–0	18 – Williams	11 – Williams	3 – Tied	Suncoast Credit Union Arena (198); Fort Myers, FL
November 27, 2020*; 10:00 am, FOX		vs. No. 1 Gonzaga; Fort Myers Tip-Off	L 67–90	1–1	20 – Flanigan	6 – Powell	3 – Powell	Suncoast Credit Union Arena (288); Fort Myers, FL
November 30, 2020*; 6:00 pm, ESPN+		at UCF	L 55–63	1–2	18 – Johnson	8 – Williams	3 – Tied	Addition Financial Arena (1,944); Orlando, FL
December 4, 2020*; 8:00 pm, SECN		South Alabama	W 90–81	2–2	26 – Powell	6 – Cardwell	9 – Powell	Auburn Arena (1,824); Auburn, AL
December 12, 2020*; 4:30 pm, ESPNU		vs. Memphis; Holiday Hoopsgiving	W 74–71	3–2	26 – Powell	8 – Powell	8 – Williams	State Farm Arena (0); Atlanta, GA
December 15, 2020*; 6:00 pm, SECN+		Texas Southern	W 80–63	4–2	18 – Flanigan	7 – Tied	6 – Powell	Auburn Arena (1,824); Auburn, AL
December 19, 2020*; 11:00 am, SECN		Troy	W 77–41	5–2	14 – Flanigan	6 – Tied	8 – Powell	Auburn Arena (1,824); Auburn, AL
December 22, 2020*; 2:00 pm, SECN		Appalachian State	W 67–53	6–2	15 – Williams	8 – Powell	6 – Flanigan	Auburn Arena (1,824); Auburn, AL
December 30, 2020; 6:00 pm, ESPN2		Arkansas	L 85–97	6–3 (0–1)	21 – Johnson	10 – Flanigan	9 – Powell	Auburn Arena (1,824); Auburn, AL
January 2, 2021; 2:30 pm, SECN		at Texas A&M	L 66–68	6–4 (0–2)	20 – Johnson	6 – Tied	7 – Williams	Reed Arena (907); College Station, TX
January 6, 2021; 8:00 pm, SECN		at Ole Miss	L 61–72	6–5 (0–3)	24 – Williams	6 – Flanigan	5 – Flanigan	The Pavilion at Ole Miss (853); Oxford, MS
January 9, 2021; 11:00 am, ESPN2		Alabama; Iron Bowl of Basketball	L 90–94	6–6 (0–4)	26 – Cooper	9 – Thor	9 – Cooper	Auburn Arena (1,824); Auburn, AL
January 13, 2021; 6:00 pm, SECN		at Georgia	W 95–77	7–6 (1–4)	28 – Cooper	8 – Thor	12 – Cooper	Stegeman Coliseum (1,638); Athens, GA
January 16, 2021; 1:00 pm, ESPN		Kentucky	W 66–59	8–6 (2–4)	21 – Flanigan	9 – Flanigan	8 – Cooper	Auburn Arena (1,824); Auburn, AL
January 20, 2021; 8:00 pm, SECN		at Arkansas	L 73–75	8–7 (2–5)	25 – Cooper	5 – Thor	4 – Cooper	Bud Walton Arena (4,400); Fayetteville, AR
January 23, 2021; 11:00 am, ESPN2		at South Carolina	W 109–86	9–7 (3–5)	24 – Flanigan	7 – Tied	12 – Cooper	Colonial Life Arena (3,250); Columbia, SC
January 26, 2021; 8:00 pm, ESPN2		No. 12 Missouri	W 88–82	10–7 (4–5)	28 – Cooper	8 – Cooper	7 – Cooper	Auburn Arena (1,824); Auburn, AL
January 30, 2021*; 3:00 pm, ESPN		at No. 2 Baylor; Big 12/SEC Challenge	L 72–84	10–8	17 – Williams	8 – Tied	6 – Flanigan	Ferrell Center (2,350); Waco, TX
February 2, 2021; 6:00 pm, SECN		Georgia	L 86–91	10–9 (4–6)	21 – Williams	6 – Johnson	9 – Cooper	Auburn Arena (1,824); Auburn, AL
February 6, 2021; 3:00 pm, ESPN2		Ole Miss	L 84–86 ^{OT}	10–10 (4–7)	16 – Tied	7 – Cambridge	14 – Cooper	Auburn Arena (1,824); Auburn, AL
February 9, 2021; 7:30 pm, SECN		at Vanderbilt	W 73–67	11–10 (5–7)	19 – Tied	10 – Williams	7 – Cooper	Memorial Gymnasium (95); Nashville, TN
February 13, 2021; 12:00 pm, CBS		at Kentucky	L 80–82	11–11 (5–8)	24 – Thor	9 – Thor	8 – Cooper	Rupp Arena (3,075); Lexington, KY
February 20, 2021; 3:00 pm, ESPN		at LSU	L 80–104	11–12 (5–9)	26 – Cooper	7 – Franklin	5 – Flanigan	Pete Maravich Assembly Center (2,384); Baton Rouge, LA
February 23, 2021; 6:00 pm, ESPN		Florida	L 57–74	11–13 (5–10)	14 – Cambridge	9 – Flanigan	4 – Flanigan	Auburn Arena (1,824); Auburn, AL
February 27, 2021; 11:00 am, ESPN		No. 25 Tennessee	W 77–72	12–13 (6–10)	23 – Flanigan	7 – Tied	3 – Tied	Auburn Arena (1,824); Auburn, AL
March 2, 2021; 6:00 pm, ESPN2		at No. 8 Alabama; Iron Bowl of Basketball	L 58–70	12–14 (6–11)	13 – Williams	9 – Flanigan	7 – Johnson	Coleman Coliseum (2,055); Tuscaloosa, AL
March 6, 2021^{[a]} 12:00 pm, SECN		Mississippi State	W 78–71	13–14 (7–11)	22 – Flanigan	9 – Thor	7 – Johnson	Auburn Arena (1,824); Auburn, AL
*Non-conference game. ^{#}Rankings from AP Poll. (#) Tournament seedings in parentheses. All times are in Central Time.

^{^[a]}The game between Auburn and Mississippi State was postponed due to inclement weather. The game was originally scheduled for February 16.

== Rankings ==
Ranking movements Legend: ██ Increase in ranking ██ Decrease in ranking — = Not ranked RV = Received votes
	Week																	
Poll	Pre	1	2	3	4	5	6	7	8	9	10	11	12	13	14	15	16	Final
AP	RV	—	—	—	—	—	—	—	—	—	—	—	—	—	—	—	—	Not released
Coaches	—	—	—	—	—	—	—	—	—	—	—	—	—	—	—	—	—	—

*AP does not release post-NCAA Tournament rankings
