= 2019–20 Auburn Tigers men's basketball team =

American college basketball season

2019–20 Auburn Tigers men's basketball

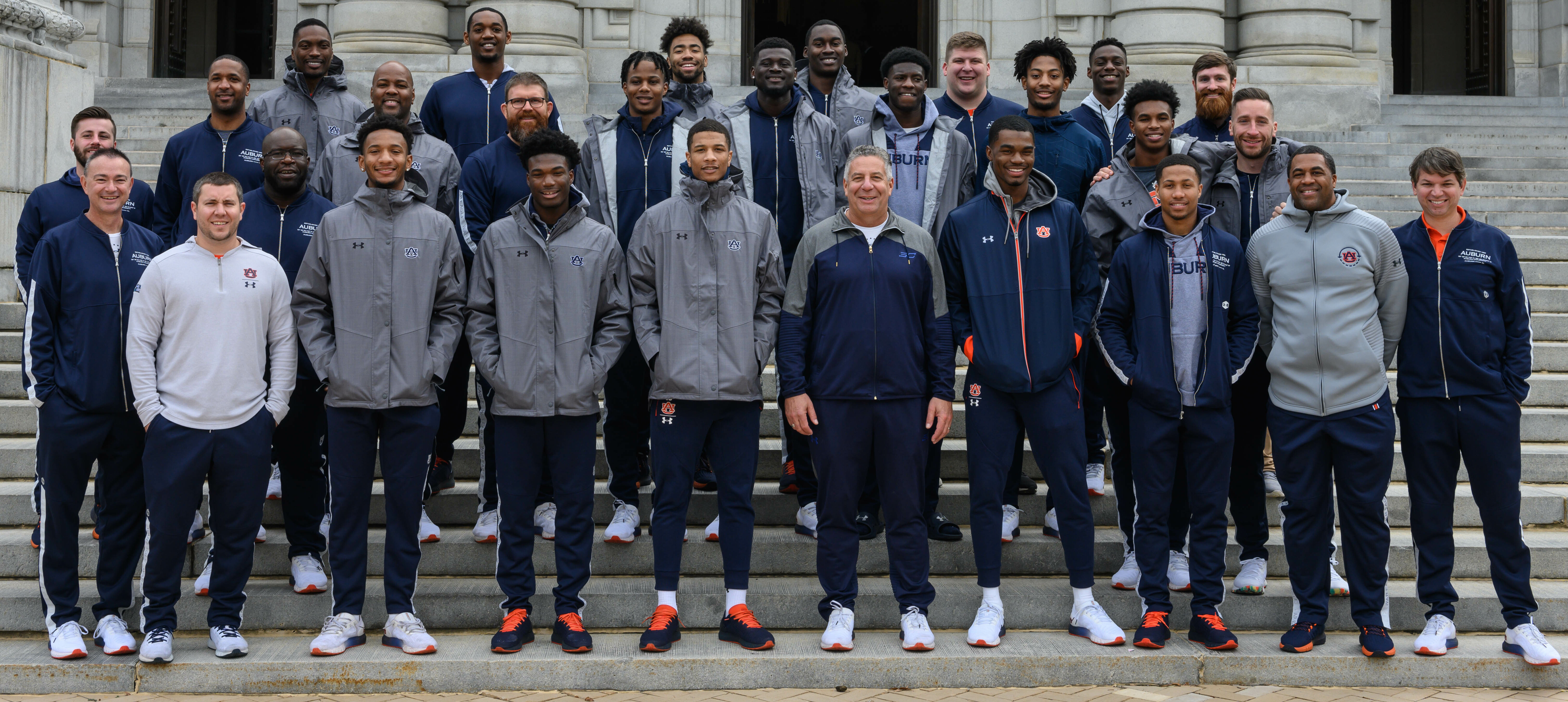

Legends Classic champions
- Conference: Southeastern Conference

Ranking
- Coaches: No. 20
- AP: No. 20
- Record: 25–6 (12–6 SEC)
- Head coach: Bruce Pearl (6th season)
- Assistant coaches: Ira Bowman (2nd season); Wes Flanigan (2nd season); Steven Pearl (3rd season)
- Home arena: Auburn Arena

2019–20 Southeastern Conference men's basketball standings
	Conf.				Overall
Team	W		L	PCT	W		L	PCT
No. 8 Kentucky	15	–	3	.833	25	–	6	.806
No. 20 Auburn	12	–	6	.667	25	–	6	.806
LSU	12	–	6	.667	21	–	10	.677
Mississippi State	11	–	7	.611	20	–	11	.645
Florida	11	–	7	.611	19	–	12	.613
South Carolina	10	–	8	.556	18	–	13	.581
Texas A&M	10	–	8	.556	16	–	14	.533
Tennessee	9	–	9	.500	17	–	14	.548
Alabama	8	–	10	.444	16	–	15	.516
Arkansas	7	–	11	.389	20	–	12	.625
Missouri	7	–	11	.389	15	–	16	.484
Ole Miss	6	–	12	.333	15	–	17	.469
Georgia	5	–	13	.278	16	–	16	.500
Vanderbilt	3	–	15	.167	11	–	21	.344
Note: The 2020 SEC tournament was canceled after the first round due to the COVID-19 pandemic. Rankings from AP poll

The 2019–20 Auburn Tigers men's basketball team represented Auburn University during the 2019–20 NCAA Division I men's basketball season as a member of the Southeastern Conference. The team's head coach was Bruce Pearl in his sixth season at Auburn. The team played their home games at Auburn Arena in Auburn, Alabama. They finished the season 25–6, 12–6 in SEC play to finish in a tie for second place. They were set to be the No. 2 seed in the SEC tournament with a bye to the quarterfinals. However, the SEC Tournament and all other postseason tournaments were cancelled amid the COVID-19 pandemic.

== Previous season ==
The Tigers finished the 2018–19 season 30–10, 11–7 in SEC play. As the No. 5 seed in the SEC tournament, the Tigers defeated Missouri, South Carolina, Florida, and Tennessee to win the tournament championship. It was Auburn's second SEC Tournament championship and first since 1985. The Tigers received the conference's automatic bid to the NCAA tournament as the No. 5 seed in the Midwest Region. There, they defeated New Mexico State and Kansas to advance to the team first Sweet Sixteen since 2003. In the Sweet Sixteen, they defeated No. 1-seeded North Carolina to advance to the Elite Eight. There they defeated No. 2 seed Kentucky to advance to the program's first Final Four. In the Final Four, they suffered a controversial loss to eventual national champion Virginia.

== Offseason ==
=== Departures ===
Auburn lost seniors Cole Blackstock, Bryce Brown, Malik Dunbar, and Horace Spencer to graduation. In addition, Jared Harper and Chuma Okeke declared for the NBA draft. The Orlando Magic picked Okeke as the 16th draft choice, making him the first Auburn player to be drafted since 2001. Harper signed with the Phoenix Suns, Brown with the Sacramento Kings, and Dunbar with the Golden State Warriors. Spencer signed with Argentine club Atenas de Cordoba.

Name	Number	Pos.	Height	Weight	Year	Hometown	Notes
Cole Blackstock	41	C	6'9"	260	Senior	Killen, AL	Graduated
Bryce Brown	2	G	6'3"	198	Senior	Stone Mountain, GA	Graduated
Malik Dunbar	4	G/F	6'6"	230	Senior	North Augusta, SC	Graduated
Jared Harper	1	G	5'11"	175	Junior	Mableton, GA	Play professionally
Chuma Okeke	5	F	6'8"	230	Sophomore	Atlanta, GA	Declared for the NBA draft; selected 16th overall by the Orlando Magic.
Horace Spencer	0	F	6'8"	225	Senior	Philadelphia, PA	Graduated

=== 2019 recruiting class ===
College recruiting information
Name	Hometown	School	Height	Weight	Commit date
Babatunde Akingbola; PF	Powder Springs, GA	McEachern (GA)	6 ft 8 in (2.03 m)	220 lb (100 kg)	Jan 11, 2018
Babatunde Akingbola; PF	Recruit ratings: Scout: Rivals: 247Sports: (75)				
Devan Cambridge; F	Athens, TN	Hillcrest Prep School	6 ft 6 in (1.98 m)	190 lb (86 kg)	Jul 17, 2019
Devan Cambridge; F	Recruit ratings: Rivals:				
Allen Flanigan; F	Little Rock, AR	Parkview Magnet High	6 ft 5 in (1.96 m)	200 lb (91 kg)	Nov 15, 2018
Allen Flanigan; F	Recruit ratings: Scout: Rivals: 247Sports: (81)				
Javon Franklin; SF	Goodman, MS	Goodman Community College	6 ft 7 in (2.01 m)	200 lb (91 kg)	May 31, 2019
Javon Franklin; SF	Recruit ratings: Scout: Rivals: 247Sports:				
Tyrell Jones; G	Orlando, FL	West Oaks Academy	6 ft 1 in (1.85 m)	170 lb (77 kg)	Nov 21, 2018
Tyrell Jones; G	Recruit ratings: Scout: Rivals: 247Sports: (82)				
Isaac Okoro; SF	Powder Springs, GA	McEachern High School	6 ft 5 in (1.96 m)	200 lb (91 kg)	Nov 21, 2018
Isaac Okoro; SF	Recruit ratings: Rivals: 247Sports: (88)				
Jaylin Williams; F	Nahunta, GA	Brantley County High School	6 ft 8 in (2.03 m)	225 lb (102 kg)	Nov 15, 2018
Jaylin Williams; F	Recruit ratings: Scout: Rivals: 247Sports: (81)				
Overall recruit ranking: Rivals: 15 247Sports: 20 ESPN: 21
Note: In many cases, Scout, Rivals, 247Sports, On3, and ESPN may conflict in their listings of height and weight.; In these cases, the average was taken. ESPN grades are on a 100-point scale.; Sources: "Auburn 2019 Basketball Commitments". Rivals.; "2019 Auburn Tigers Recruiting Class". ESPN.; "2019 Team Ranking". Rivals.

=== 2020 Recruiting class ===
College recruiting information (2020)
Name	Hometown	School	Height	Weight	Commit date
Justin Powell; SG	Prospect, KY	North Oldham (KY)	6 ft 6 in (1.98 m)	195 lb (88 kg)	Jun 7, 2019
Justin Powell; SG	Recruit ratings: Rivals: 247Sports: ESPN: (83)				
Sharife Cooper; PG	Powder Springs, GA	McEachern (GA)	6 ft 0 in (1.83 m)	160 lb (73 kg)	Sep 27, 2019
Sharife Cooper; PG	Recruit ratings: Rivals: 247Sports: ESPN: (94)				
Chris Moore; PF	West Memphis, AR	West Memphis (AR)	6 ft 7 in (2.01 m)	225 lb (102 kg)	Nov 16, 2019
Chris Moore; PF	Recruit ratings: Rivals: 247Sports: ESPN: (79)				
JT Thor; PF	Anchorage, AK	Norcross (GA)	6 ft 10 in (2.08 m)	195 lb (88 kg)	Apr 12, 2020
JT Thor; PF	Recruit ratings: Rivals: 247Sports: ESPN: (86)				
Dylan Cardwell; C	Augusta, GA	McEachern (GA)	6 ft 10 in (2.08 m)	220 lb (100 kg)	May 7, 2020
Dylan Cardwell; C	Recruit ratings: Rivals: 247Sports: ESPN: (79)				
Overall recruit ranking: Rivals: 6 247Sports: 9 ESPN: 6
Note: In many cases, Scout, Rivals, 247Sports, On3, and ESPN may conflict in their listings of height and weight.; In these cases, the average was taken. ESPN grades are on a 100-point scale.; Sources: "Auburn 2020 Basketball Commitments". Rivals.; "2020 Auburn Tigers Recruiting Class". ESPN.; "2020 Team Ranking". Rivals.

== Preseason ==
=== SEC media poll ===
The SEC media poll was released on October 15, 2019.

Media poll
Predicted finish	Team
1	Kentucky
2	Florida
3	LSU
4	Auburn
5	Tennessee
6	Alabama
7	Mississippi State
8	Ole Miss
9	Georgia
10	South Carolina
11	Arkansas
12	Texas A&M
13	Missouri
14	Vanderbilt

== Roster ==
2019–20 Auburn Tigers men's basketball team
Players
Coaches

Pos.	#	Name	Height	Weight	Year	Previous school	Hometown
G	0	Tyrell Jones	6 ft 1 in (1.85 m)	170 lb (77 kg)	Fr	West Oaks Academy	Chicago, IL
G	1	Jamal Johnson	6 ft 4 in (1.93 m)	195 lb (88 kg)	RS So	Memphis	Birmingham, AL
F	2	Jaylin Williams	6 ft 7 in (2.01 m)	215 lb (98 kg)	Fr	Brantley County	Nahunta, GA
F	3	Danjel Purifoy	6 ft 7 in (2.01 m)	230 lb (104 kg)	RS Sr	Hargrave Military Academy	Centerville, AL
F	4	Javon Franklin	6 ft 7 in (2.01 m)	218 lb (99 kg)	RS So	Holmes CC	Little Rock, AR
G	5	J'Von McCormick	6 ft 0 in (1.83 m)	185 lb (84 kg)	Sr	Lee College	New Orleans, LA
G	10	Samir Doughty	6 ft 4 in (1.93 m)	195 lb (88 kg)	RS Sr	VCU	Philadelphia, PA
G	12	Lior Berman (W)	6 ft 4 in (1.93 m)	190 lb (86 kg)	Fr	Mountain Brook	Birmingham, AL
C	13	Babatunde Akingbola	6 ft 10 in (2.08 m)	236 lb (107 kg)	Fr	McEachern	Ogun, Nigeria
G	14	Preston Cook (W)	6 ft 4 in (1.93 m)	200 lb (91 kg)	So	Auburn	Auburn, AL
F	20	Myles Parker (W)	6 ft 8 in (2.03 m)	200 lb (91 kg)	So	Madison Academy	Madison, AL
G	21	Will Macoy	6 ft 4 in (1.93 m)	200 lb (91 kg)	Sr	Vestavia Hills	Birmingham, AL
G	22	Allen Flanigan	6 ft 5 in (1.96 m)	200 lb (91 kg)	Fr	Parkview Magnet	Little Rock, AR
F	23	Isaac Okoro	6 ft 6 in (1.98 m)	225 lb (102 kg)	Fr	McEachern	Powder Springs, GA
F	24	Anfernee McLemore	6 ft 7 in (2.01 m)	220 lb (100 kg)	Sr	Worth County	Warwick, GA
G	33	Chase Maasdorp (W)	6 ft 0 in (1.83 m)	175 lb (79 kg)	So	The Out-of-Door Academy	Lakewood Ranch, FL
G	35	Devan Cambridge	6 ft 6 in (1.98 m)	190 lb (86 kg)	Fr	Hillcrest Prep	Nashville, TN
C	50	Austin Wiley	6 ft 11 in (2.11 m)	260 lb (118 kg)	Sr	Spain Park	Hoover, AL
F	54	Thomas Collier (W)	6 ft 9 in (2.06 m)	215 lb (98 kg)	RS Sr	Briarwood Christian	Birmingham, AL

Head coach

- Bruce Pearl (Boston College)

Assistant coach(es)

- Ira Bowman (Penn)
- Wes Flanigan (Auburn)
- Steven Pearl (Tennessee)

Legend

- (C) Team captain
- (S) Suspended
- (I) Ineligible
- (W) Walk-on
- Injured
- Current redshirt

Roster
Last update: October 7, 2019

== Schedule and results ==
Date time, TV	Rank^{#}	Opponent^{#}	Result	Record	High points	High rebounds	High assists	Site (attendance) city, state
Exhibition
November 1, 2019*; 8:00 pm	No. 24	Eckerd	W 97–53	–	20 – McCormick	10 – Wiley	5 – McCormick	Auburn Arena (9,121); Auburn, AL
Regular season
November 5, 2019*; 8:00 pm, SECN	No. 24	Georgia Southern	W 83–74	1–0	20 – Doughty	9 – Wiley	4 – McCormick	Auburn Arena (8,702); Auburn, AL
November 8, 2019*; 5:00 pm, CBSSN	No. 24	vs. Davidson; Veterans Classic	W 76–66	2–0	17 – Okoro	10 – Wiley	5 – McCormick	Alumni Hall (4,549); Annapolis, MD
November 12, 2019*; 7:00 pm, ESPN+	No. 22	at South Alabama	W 70–69	3–0	15 – Okoro	10 – Doughty	6 – Okoro	Mitchell Center (10,068); Mobile, AL
November 15, 2019*; 6:00 pm, SECN	No. 22	Cal State Northridge; Legends Classic campus-site game	W 116–70	4–0	33 – Doughty	9 – Wiley	16 – McCormick	Auburn Arena (8,389); Auburn, AL
November 18, 2019*; 7:00 pm, SECN	No. 19	Colgate; Legends Classic campus-site game	W 91–62	5–0	20 – Doughty	10 – Wiley	8 – McCormick	Auburn Arena (7,522); Auburn, AL
November 25, 2019*; 8:30 pm, ESPNews	No. 18	vs. New Mexico; Legends Classic semifinals	W 84–59	6–0	19 – Doughty	13 – Wiley	6 – McCormick	Barclays Center (6,812); Brooklyn, NY
November 26, 2019*; 6:30 pm, ESPN2	No. 18	vs. Richmond; Legends Classic championship	W 79–65	7–0	22 – Doughty	9 – Purifoy	6 – McCormick	Barclays Center (6,420); Brooklyn, NY
December 5, 2019*; 8:00 pm, SECN	No. 14	Furman	W 81–78 ^{OT}	8–0	18 – Okoro	12 – Wiley	4 – McCormick	Auburn Arena (8,226); Auburn, AL
December 14, 2019*; 3:00 pm, ESPN2	No. 12	vs. Saint Louis; Mike Slive Invitational	W 67–61	9–0	20 – McCormick	8 – Wiley	6 – McCormick	Legacy Arena (12,614); Birmingham, AL
December 19, 2019*; 8:00 pm, ESPN2	No. 12	NC State	W 79–73	10–0	24 – Doughty	8 – Wiley	4 – Doughty	Auburn Arena (9,121); Auburn, AL
December 21, 2019*; 5:00 pm, SECN	No. 12	Lehigh	W 74–51	11–0	18 – McCormick	15 – Wiley	4 – Tied	Auburn Arena (9,121); Auburn, AL
December 29, 2019*; 3:00 pm, SECN	No. 8	Lipscomb	W 86–59	12–0	17 – Purifoy	11 – Wiley	7 – Doughty	Auburn Arena (9,121); Auburn, AL
January 4, 2020; 3:30 pm, SECN	No. 8	at Mississippi State	W 80–68	13–0 (1–0)	28 – McCormick	8 – Tied	4 – McCormick	Humphrey Coliseum (8,447); Starkville, MS
January 8, 2020; 8:00 pm, SECN	No. 5	Vanderbilt	W 83–79	14–0 (2–0)	23 – Okoro	12 – Wiley	3 – Okoro	Auburn Arena (9,121); Auburn, AL
January 11, 2020; 11:00 am, ESPNews	No. 5	Georgia	W 82–60	15–0 (3–0)	17 – Doughty	8 – Purifoy	4 – Doughty	Auburn Arena (9,121); Auburn, AL
January 15, 2020; 8:00 pm, ESPN2	No. 4	at Alabama; Iron Bowl of Basketball	L 64–83	15–1 (3–1)	13 – Okoro	13 – Wiley	3 – Tied	Coleman Coliseum (14,474); Tuscaloosa, AL
January 18, 2020; 12:30 pm, CBS	No. 4	at Florida	L 47–69	15–2 (3–2)	10 – Purifoy	6 – Wiley	2 – Tied	O'Connell Center (10,756); Gainesville, FL
January 22, 2020; 6:00 pm, ESPNU	No. 16	South Carolina	W 80–67	16–2 (4–2)	26 – Cambridge	8 – Wiley	7 – Okoro	Auburn Arena (8,430); Auburn, AL
January 25, 2020*; 11:00 am, ESPNU	No. 16	Iowa State; Big 12/SEC Challenge	W 80–76	17–2	19 – Okoro	9 – Wiley	5 – Doughty	Auburn Arena (9,121); Auburn, AL
January 28, 2020; 8:00 pm, ESPNU	No. 17	at Ole Miss	W 83–82 ^{2OT}	18–2 (5–2)	19 – McLemore	9 – Tied	3 – Tied	The Pavilion at Ole Miss (8,125); Oxford, MS
February 1, 2020; 5:00 pm, ESPN	No. 17	No. 13 Kentucky; ESPN College GameDay	W 75–66	19–2 (6–2)	23 – Doughty	10 – Wiley	4 – McCormick	Auburn Arena (9,121); Auburn, AL
February 4, 2020; 6:00 pm, SECN	No. 11	at Arkansas	W 79–76 ^{OT}	20–2 (7–2)	23 – Doughty	10 – McLemore	3 – Tied	Bud Walton Arena (17,196); Fayetteville, AR
February 8, 2020; 11:00 am, ESPN	No. 11	No. 18 LSU	W 91–90 ^{OT}	21–2 (8–2)	26 – Doughty	13 – Wiley	9 – McCormick	Auburn Arena (9,121); Auburn, AL
February 12, 2020; 6:00 pm, ESPN2	No. 11	Alabama; Iron Bowl of Basketball	W 95–91 ^{OT}	22–2 (9–2)	19 – Okoro	17 – Wiley	5 – McCormick	Auburn Arena (9,121); Auburn, AL
February 15, 2020; 5:00 pm, ESPN2	No. 11	at Missouri	L 73–85	22–3 (9–3)	22 – Wiley	10 – Wiley	4 – Doughty	Mizzou Arena (12,506); Columbia, MO
February 19, 2020; 6:00 pm, ESPN2	No. 13	at Georgia	L 55–65	22–4 (9–4)	22 – McCormick	9 – Wiley	3 – Doughty	Stegeman Coliseum (10,181); Athens, GA
February 22, 2020; 11:00 am, CBS	No. 13	Tennessee	W 73–66	23–4 (10–4)	22 – Doughty	7 – Wiley	4 – McCormick	Auburn Arena (9,121); Auburn, AL
February 25, 2020; 6:00 pm, SECN	No. 15	Ole Miss	W 67–58	24–4 (11–4)	15 – Wiley	11 – Wiley	4 – Doughty	Auburn Arena (9,121); Auburn, AL
February 29, 2020; 2:45 pm, CBS	No. 15	at No. 8 Kentucky	L 66–73	24–5 (11–5)	13 – McCormick	12 – Wiley	5 – Doughty	Rupp Arena (20,638); Lexington, KY
March 4, 2020; 6:00 pm, ESPN2	No. 17	Texas A&M	L 75–78	24–6 (11–6)	25 – Doughty	5 – Tied	10 – McCormick	Auburn Arena (9,121); Auburn, AL
March 7, 2020; 11:00 am, ESPN2	No. 17	at Tennessee	W 85–63	25–6 (12–6)	32 – Doughty	9 – Wiley	3 – Tied	Thompson–Boling Arena (21,156); Knoxville, TN
SEC Tournament
March 13, 2020; 6:00 pm, SECN	(2) No. 20	vs. Quarterfinals	Cancelled due to the COVID-19 pandemic					Bridgestone Arena; Nashville, TN
*Non-conference game. ^{#}Rankings from AP Poll. (#) Tournament seedings in parentheses. All times are in Central Time.

== Rankings ==
Ranking movements Legend: ██ Increase in ranking ██ Decrease in ranking т = Tied with team above or below
	Week																			
Poll	Pre	1	2	3	4	5	6	7	8	9	10	11	12	13	14	15	16	17	18	Final
AP	24	22	19	18	14	12	12	8	8	5	4	16	17	11	11	13	15	17	20	20
Coaches	23	23*	18	17	13	10	9	8	7	5	4	16	16	10	11	12	15	15-T	17	20

*AP does not release post-NCAA Tournament rankings

== Awards and honors ==
=== Samir Doughty ===
- Coaches' First Team All-SEC
- AP Second Team All-SEC

=== Isaac Okoro ===
- Coaches' Second Team All-SEC
- Coaches' SEC All-Freshman Team
- Coaches' SEC All-Defensive Team

=== Austin Wiley ===
- Preseason Coaches' Second Team All-SEC
- Legends Classic MVP
