= Brantley County School District =

School district in Georgia (U.S. state)

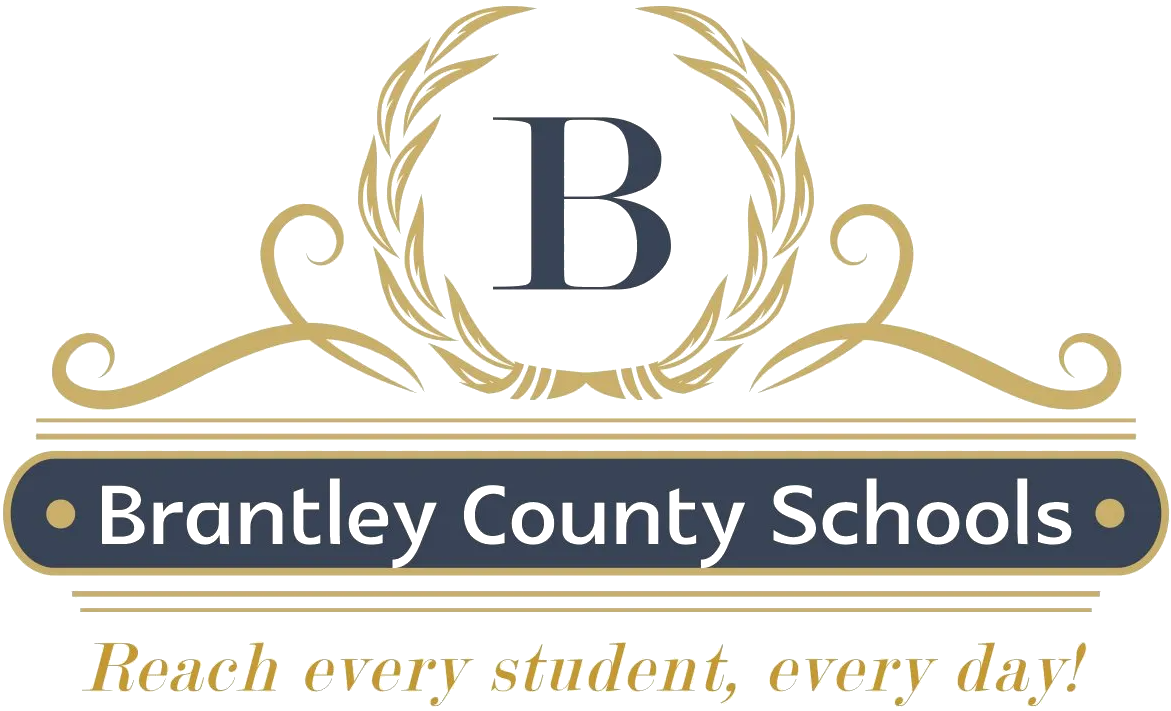

Address
- 272 School Circle Nahunta, Georgia, 31553; United States
- Coordinates: 31.193292°N 81.983328°W

District information
- Grades: Pre-kindergarten – 12
- Superintendent: Kim Morgan

Students and staff
- Enrollment: 3,403 (2022–23)
- Faculty: 244.40 (FTE)

Other information
- Accreditation: Southern Association of Colleges and Schools; Georgia Accrediting Commission
- Fax: (912) 462-6731
- Website: brantley.k12.ga.us

The Brantley County School District is a public school district in Brantley County, Georgia, United States, based in Nahunta. It serves the communities of Hoboken, Hortense, Nahunta, and Waynesville.

== Schools ==
The Brantley County School District has five elementary schools, one middle school, and one high school.

=== Elementary schools ===
- Atkinson Elementary School
- Hoboken Elementary School
- Nahunta Elementary School
- Nahunta Primary School
- Waynesville Primary School

=== Middle school ===
- Brantley County Middle School

=== High school ===
- Brantley County High School
