= Brantley County Courthouse =

- U.S. National Register of Historic Places
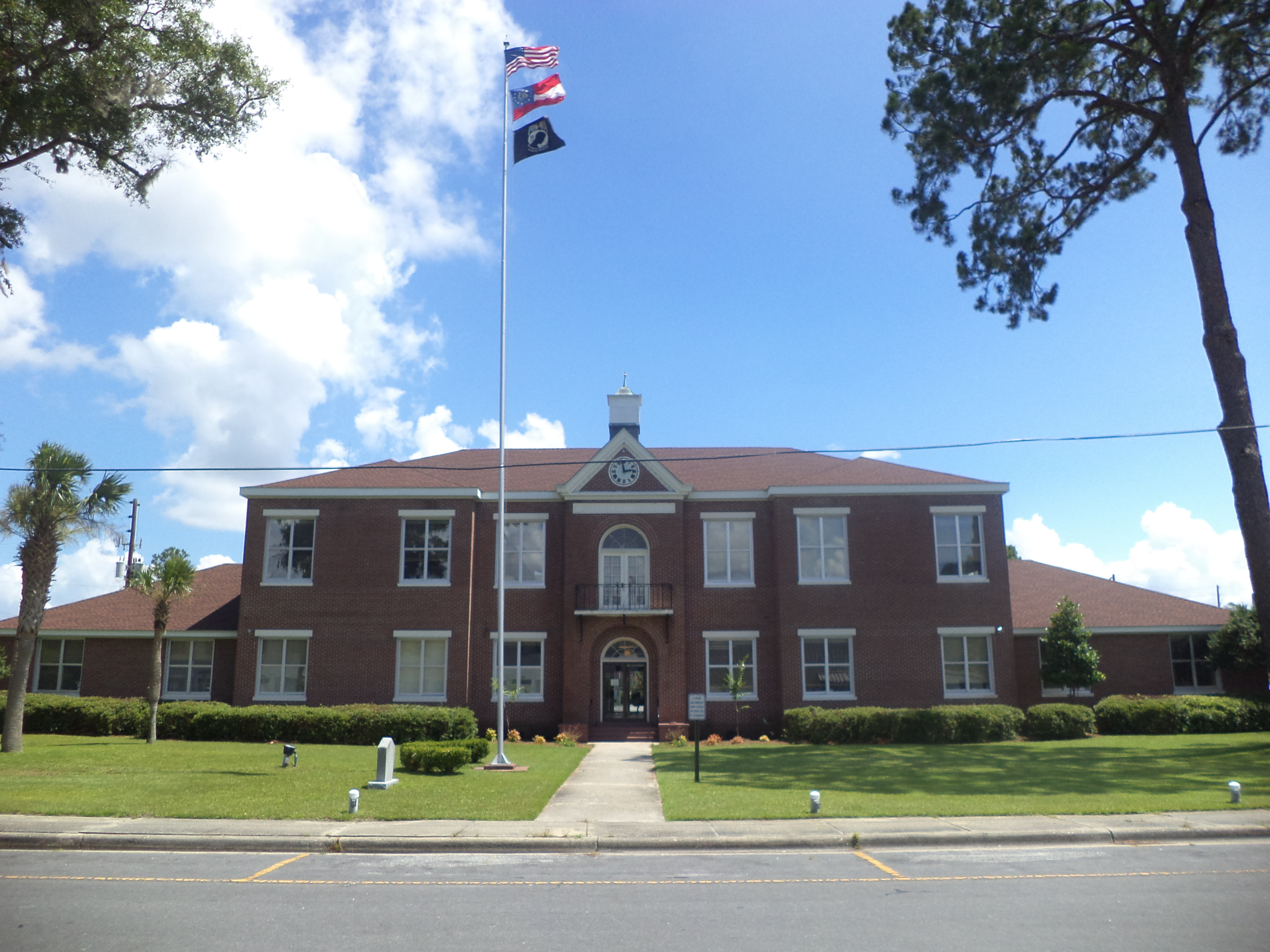

- Location within Georgia Location within the United States
- Location: 117 Brantley St., Nahunta, Georgia
- Coordinates: 31.20300°N 81.98157°W
- Area: 1.5 acres (0.61 ha)
- Built: 1930
- Built by: Ledsinger and Turner
- Architect: Thomas J. Darling
- Architectural style: Colonial Revival
- MPS: Georgia County Courthouses TR
- NRHP reference No.: 95000712
- Added to NRHP: June 14, 1995

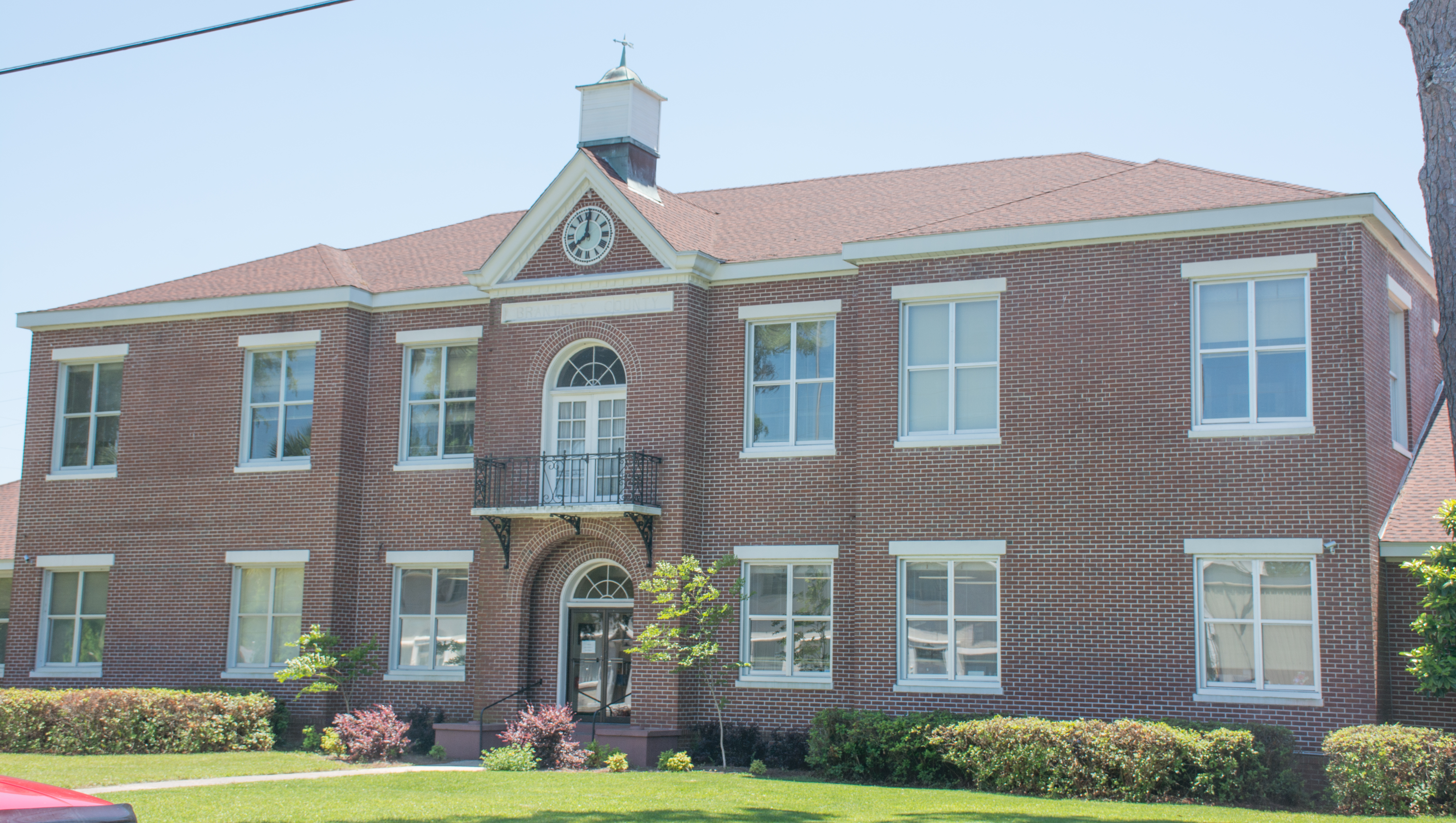
Brantley County Courthouse

The Brantley County Courthouse is a historic courthouse for Brantley County in Nahunta, Georgia. It was listed on the National Register of Historic Places on June 14, 1995. It is located at 117 Brantley Street.

Hoboken, Georgia was Brantley County's original county seat and the county's first courthouse was built there in 1921, a year after the county's creation. In 1923 the legislature designated Nahunta as Brantley's county seat. A two-story brick courthouse was built in Nahunta in 1930 and remains the county courthouse today. An addition was added in 1978.

== See also ==
- National Register of Historic Places listings in Brantley County, Georgia
