= National Register of Historic Places listings in Brantley County, Georgia =

This is a list of properties and districts in Brantley County, Georgia that are listed on the National Register of Historic Places (NRHP).

This National Park Service list is complete through NPS recent listings posted March 21, 2025.

== Current listings ==
	Name on the Register	Image	Date listed	Location	City or town	Description
1	Brantley County Courthouse	Brantley County Courthouse	June 14, 1995 (#95000712)	117 Brantley St. 31°12′11″N 81°58′54″W	Nahunta	
2	Sylvester Mumford House	Sylvester Mumford House	June 28, 1982 (#82002386)	Off U.S. 84; 31°14′02″N 81°46′45″W	Waynesville	Burned in 2005
