= Brunswick metropolitan area =

Coordinates: 31°15′N 81°34′W

- Metropolitan statistical area
- Brunswick–St. Simons, GA metropolitan statistical area
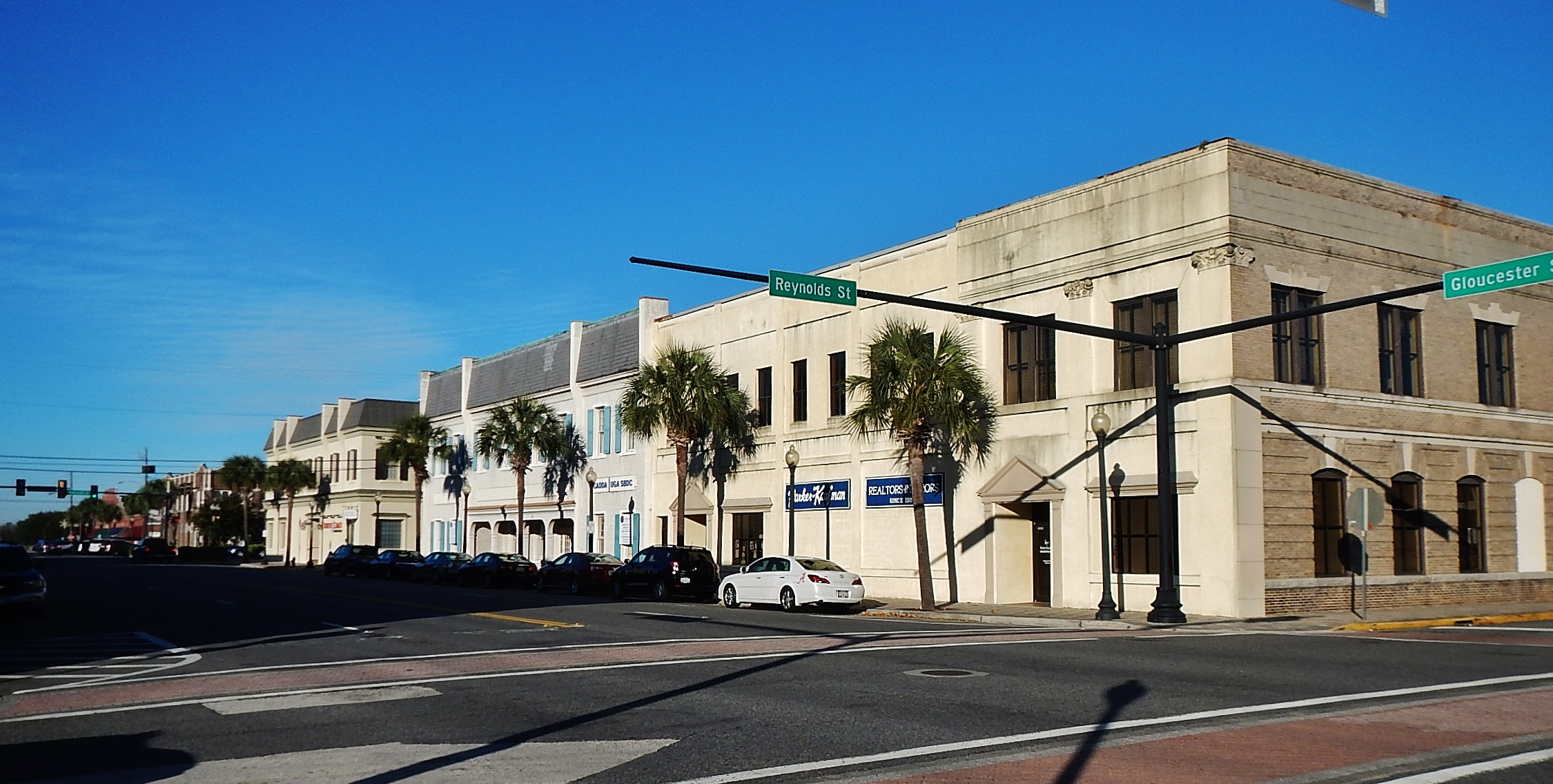
- Downtown Brunswick
Map of Brunswick–St. Simons, GA MSA
City of Brunswick
Brunswick, GA MSA
- Country: United States
- State: Georgia
- Largest city: Brunswick
- Other cities: St. Simons Island; Darien; Nahunta

Area
  - Total: 1,300 sq mi (3,400 km^{2})

Population (2020)
  - Total: 113,495
  - Rank: 375th in the U.S.
  - Density: 78/sq mi (30/km^{2})
- Time zone: UTC−5 (EST)
  - Summer (DST): UTC−4 (EDT)
- Area code: 912

The Brunswick metropolitan area is the Coastal Georgian metropolitan statistical area centered on the principal city of Brunswick, Georgia. The U.S. Office of Management and Budget, Census Bureau and other entities define Brunswick's metropolitan statistical area as comprising Glynn, Brantley, and McIntosh counties, including the cities of Brunswick and Darien. According to the 2020 census, the metropolitan area had a population of 113,495.

== Geography ==
Comprising Brantley, Glynn, and McIntosh counties, the Brunswick metropolitan area is located along the Lower Coastal Plain. According to the U.S. Census Bureau, the MSA has a total area of 1,300 square miles (3,400 km^{2}); if it were a U.S. state or territory, the Brunswick metropolitan area would be larger than the U.S. Virgin Islands, but smaller than Rhode Island.

=== Communities ===
==== Places with more than 15,000 inhabitants ====
- Brunswick (principal city)

==== Places with 7,500 to 15,000 inhabitants ====
- St. Simons
- Country Club Estates

==== Places with less than 7,500 inhabitants ====
- Dock Junction
- Darien
- Nahunta
- Hoboken

==== Unincorporated communities ====
- Townsend
- Eulonia
- Hortense
- Waynesville
- Jekyll Island
- Trudie

== Demographics ==
At the 2000 United States census, there were 93,044 people, 36,846 households, and 25,557 families residing within the MSA. At the 2020 U.S. census, its metropolitan population grew to 113,495; and during the 2022 census estimates, its population was 114,442.

Among its metropolitan statistical population, the racial makeup in 2000 was 73.30% White, 24.13% African American, 0.26% Native American, 0.49% Asian, 0.04% Pacific Islander, 0.73% from other races, and 1.06% from two or more races; Hispanics or Latinos of any race were 2.44% of the population. In 2022, its racial and ethnic makeup was 68% non-Hispanic white, 22% African American, 1% Asian, 3% multiracial, and 6% Hispanic or Latino of any race according to the American Community Survey.

In 2000, the median income for a household in the MSA was $33,076, and the median income for a family was $38,960. Males had a median income of $31,138 versus $21,288 for females. The per capita income for the MSA was $16,558. As of 2022, its median household income was $59,383 with a per capita income of $37,951. An estimated 12.9% of the metropolitan region's population lived at or below the poverty line.

== Transportation ==
=== Air ===
- Brunswick Golden Isles Airport

=== Highways ===
- Interstate 95
- U.S. Route 17
- U.S. Route 341
- U.S. Route 25

== See also ==
- Georgia statistical areas
- List of municipalities in Georgia (U.S. state)
- Golden Isles of Georgia
