= Sylvester Mumford House =

Historic house in Georgia, United States

- U.S. National Register of Historic Places
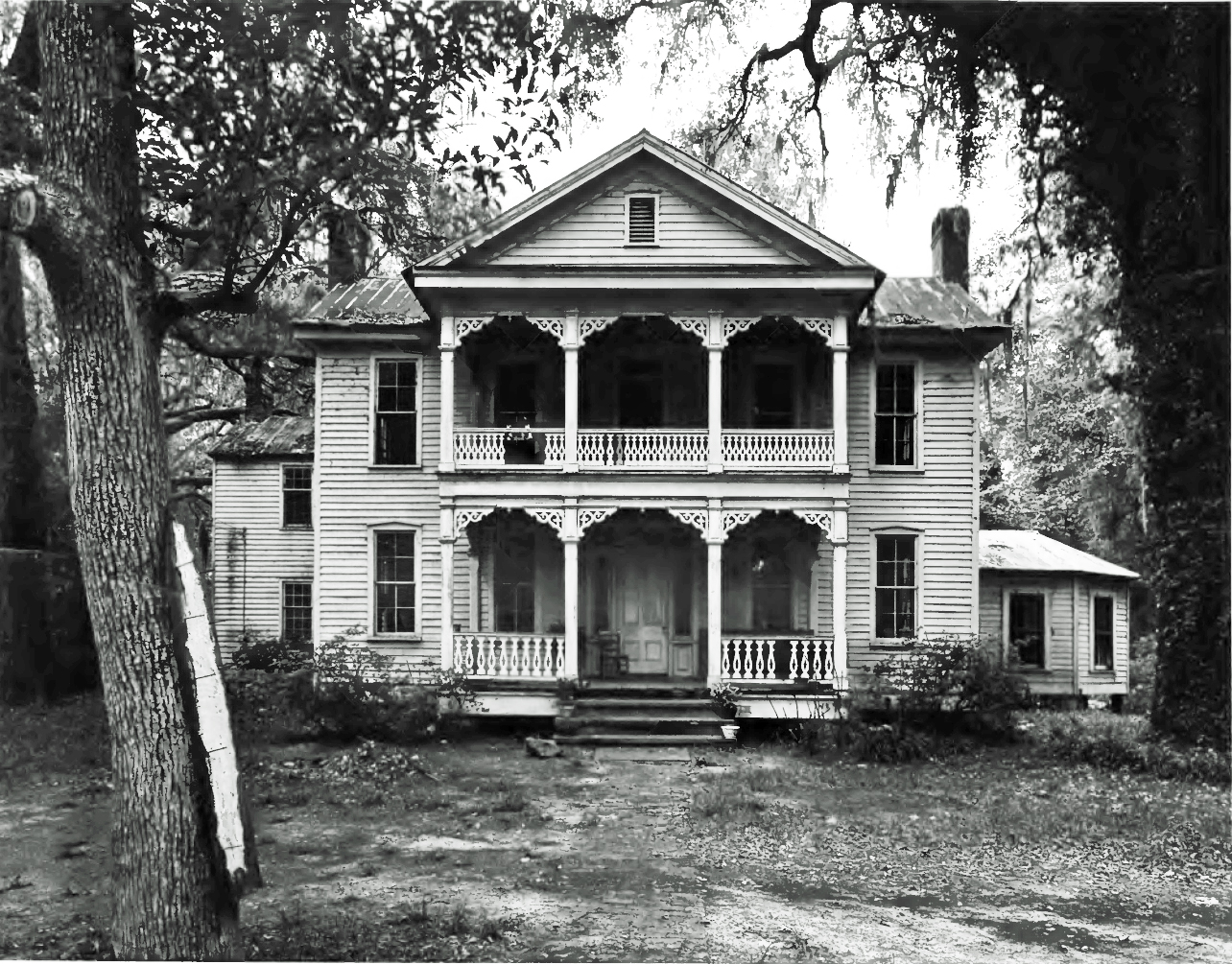

- Location within Georgia
- Nearest city: Waynesville, Georgia
- Coordinates: 31°14′2″N 81°46′45″W
- Area: 27.5 acres (11.1 ha)
- Built: c. 1848
- NRHP reference No.: 82002386
- Added to NRHP: June 28, 1982

The Sylvester Mumford House was a historic residence in Brantley County, Georgia near Waynesville that was built in c. 1848. It was listed on the National Register of Historic Places in 1982. The home burned on March 23, 2005.

It was the home of Sylvester Mumford (1810-1889), who owned a store in Waynesville and served as Postmaster. It was a "two-over-two room" Plantation Plain-style wood-frame house with Greek Revival influences. A Victorian style front porch and two wings built after the Civil War reflect the concern of its owner to keep up with architectural style. Three historic outbuildings were included in the NRHP nomination.

The family was "particularly well-remembered in the area because Mumford's daughter, Gertrude Mumford Parkhurst, used money inherited from her parents to establish three still-existing funds for the education of poor white girls and orphans from Brantley County."

The homesite is located off U.S. 82.

== See also ==
- National Register of Historic Places listings in Brantley County, Georgia
