= Lower Coastal Plain (Georgia) =

Subregion

Coordinates: 31°30′N 82°0′W

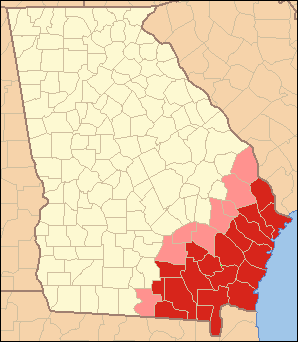
The counties shown in red are wholly located within Georgia's Lower Coastal Plain, while only portions of the salmon-colored counties are within the subregion.

Southeast Georgia's Lower Coastal Plain, often referred to as the Coastal Empire, is a subregion that encompasses the lowest-lying areas of the Atlantic coastal plain in the state, containing barrier islands, marshes, and swampy lowlands, as well as flat plains and low terraces. It differs from Georgia's Upper Coastal Plain in that it is lower in elevation with less relief and wetter soils. The United States Environmental Protection Agency defines the Lower Coastal Plain as an ecoregion, part of the larger, interstate Southern Coastal Plain.

Within the subregion flow the major rivers the Altamaha, Ogeechee, Saint Marys, Savannah, Satilla, and Suwannee (all of which, except the Suwannee River, empty into the Atlantic Ocean); the Saint Marys and Suwannee rivers have their origins in the Okefenokee Swamp. The Coastal Plain is also the home to Savannah, the first capital city which was declared in 1733.

The subregion is somewhat synonymous with Coastal Georgia, and contains the counties of Atkinson, Bacon, Brantley, Camden, Charlton, Clinch, Echols, Glynn, Lanier, Pierce, Ware, and Wayne, south of the Altamaha River; and Bryan, Chatham, Effingham, Liberty, Long, and McIntosh, north of the Altamaha River. The three metropolitan areas are those of Brunswick, Hinesville–Fort Stewart, and Savannah. The largest census county divisions, in the order of decreasing population, are Savannah, Hinesville, Pooler–Bloomingdale, Brunswick, Saint Marys, Waycross, Jesup, Richmond Hill, Tybee Island, and Everett. The total population of the eighteen-county subregion is 726,132 (286,271 south of, and 439,861 north of, the Altamaha River), as of the 2010 U.S. census.

== See also ==
- Golden Isles of Georgia
- South Carolina Lowcountry
- North Florida
- First Coast
