= Coastal Georgia =

- Region
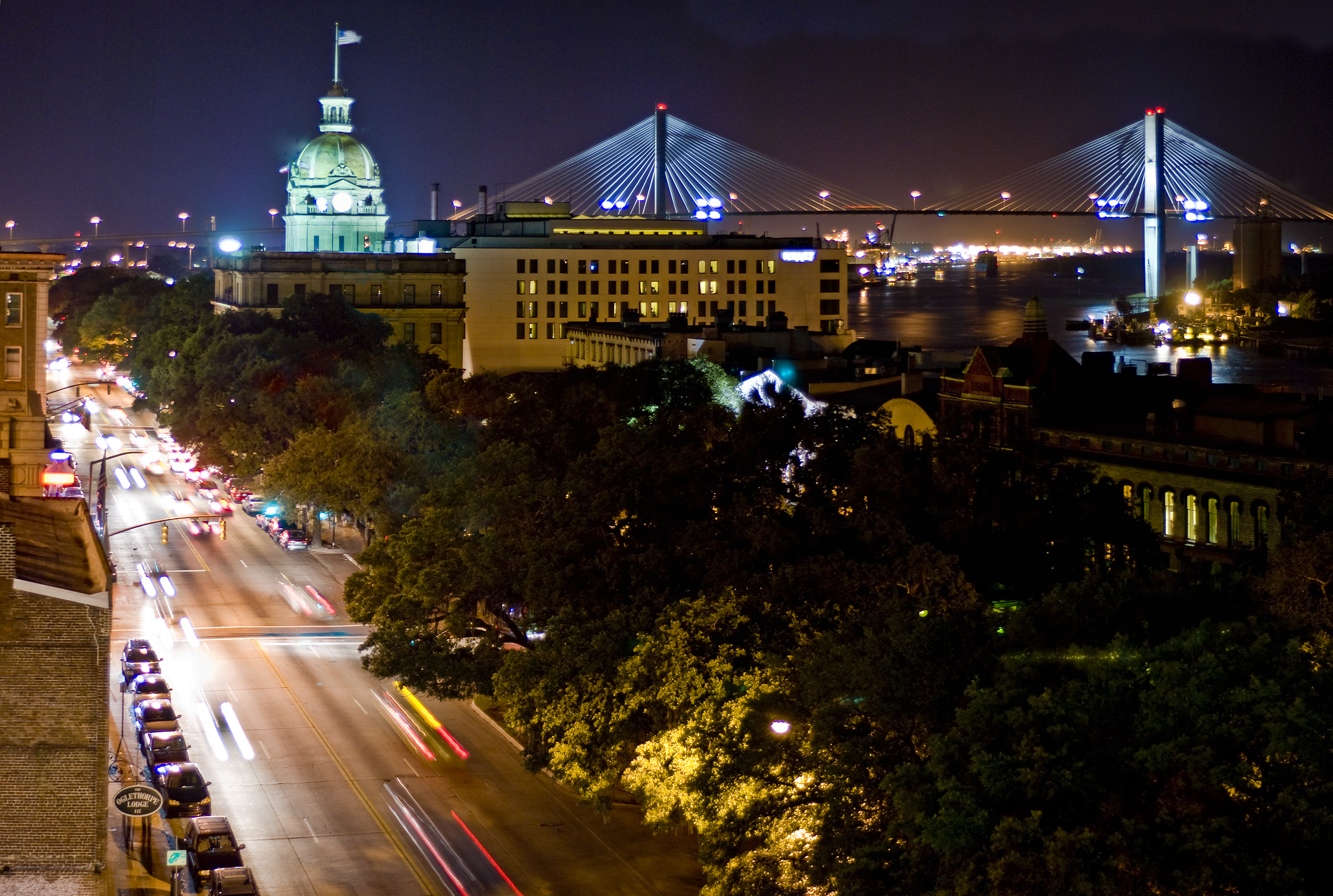
- Downtown Savannah

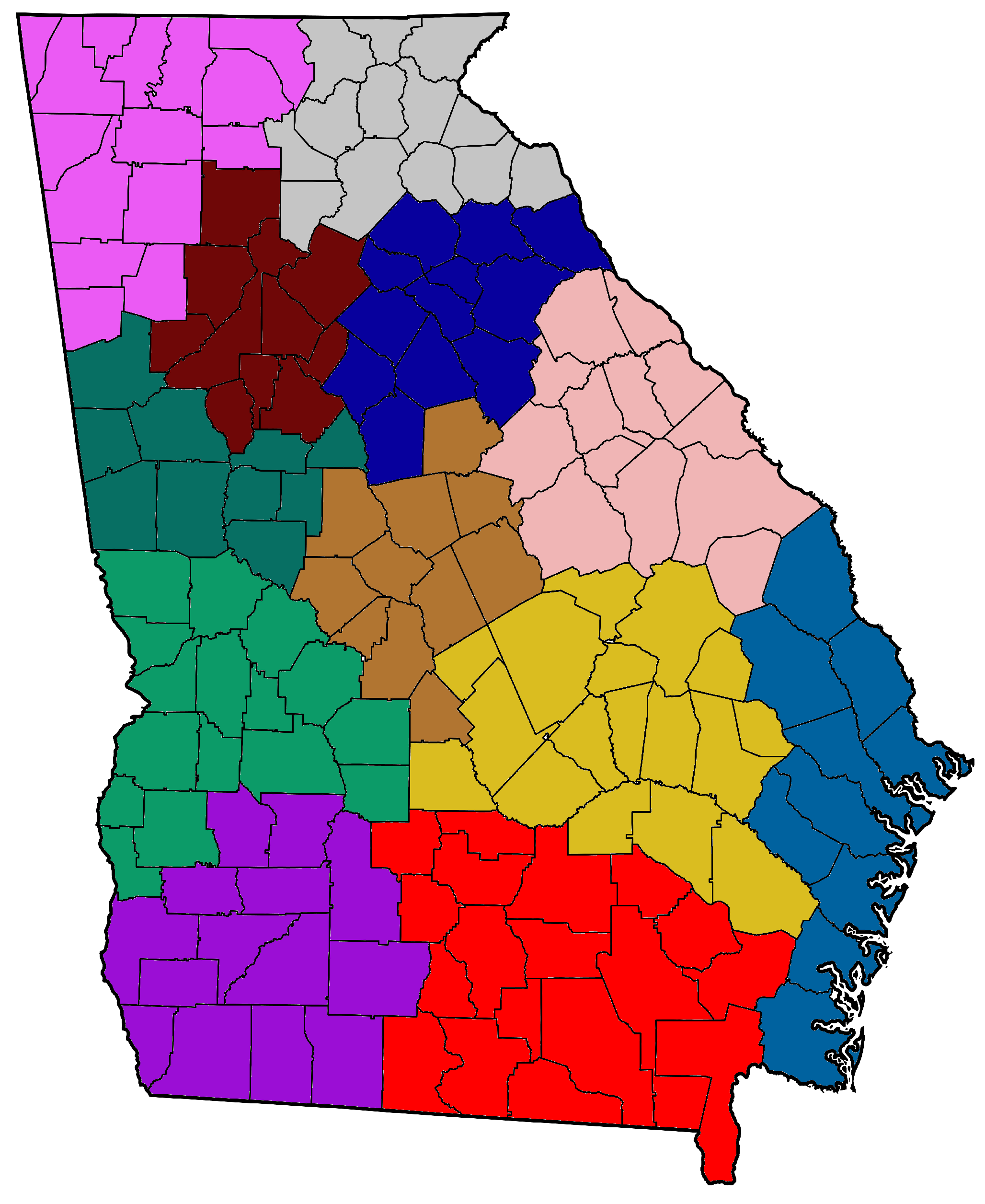
- Coastal Georgia highlighted in light blue

- Location of Georgia in the United States
- Country: United States
- State: Georgia
- Largest city: Savannah

Population (2020)
  - Total: 731,630
- Demonym: Coastal Georgian
- Website: georgia.org/regions/coastal-georgia

Coastal Georgia is a ten-county region in the U.S. state of Georgia, bordering South Carolina and Florida. It comprises a substantial portion of the state's Lower Coastal Plain. The region's largest city and metropolitan area is Savannah. Coastal Georgia's total population was 731,630 according to the 2020 United States census.

== Geography ==
Coastal Georgia forms part of the Lower Coastal Plain, alongside Southeast Georgia. It consists of ten counties, according to the Georgia Department of Economic Development: Bryan, Bulloch, Camden, Chatham, Effingham, Glynn, Liberty, Long, McIntosh, and Screven. Coastal Georgia also includes the Golden Isles.

The region counts three metropolitan statistical areas (MSAs): the Savannah metropolitan area, the Hinesville metropolitan area, and the Brunswick metropolitan area. Both the Savannah and Hinesville MSAs form the Savannah–Hinesville–Statesboro-Jesup combined statistical area. With Camden County, the Jacksonville–St. Marys–Palatka, FL–GA CSA is included.

== Demographics ==
According to the 2020 United States census, the counties forming Coastal Georgia's population numbered 731,630 residents.

Racially and ethnically, Coastal Georgia has been inhabited by European American and African American settlers since colonization, in common with most of the present-day state. Among its racial and ethnic makeup, the Gullah-Geechee people have maintained a historic presence along the coastal plains of the region.

Since the migration of settlers from other states beginning in the 21st century, the Gullah-Geechee community and culture have been declining in the region due to development by private companies and state officials throughout the Gullah Geechee Cultural Heritage Corridor.

In terms of religious beliefs and observance, Coastal Georgia is a part of the Bible Belt. In 2020, the Association of Religion Data Archives determined Baptists, non-denominational Protestants, Methodists, Catholics, Holiness, and Pentecostals were the largest Christian groups operating in the region.

The single largest Christian denominations were the Southern Baptist Convention, United Methodist Church, Catholic Church, National Missionary Baptist Convention of America, Church of God (Cleveland, Tennessee), National Baptist Convention (USA), and African Methodist Episcopal Church. Other notable dominations with a presence have included the Episcopal Church and nontrinitarian Church of Jesus Christ of Latter-day Saints.

Non-Christian religions accounted for a minority of the region's religious landscape. The largest non-Christian religion was Judaism. Following, Hinduism and Islam were the other prominent non-Christian religious groups in Coastal Georgia. Buddhism and the Baha'i Faith also had small communities in the area. Among the Gullah-Geechee community, Lowcounty Voodoo or Hoodoo has been traditionally practiced among the population.

== Economy ==
Coastal Georgia's economy, according to the Georgia Department of Economic Development, is stimulated by manufacturing, agriculture, ports, the government and military, tourism, and film. The Port of Savannah and Port of Brunswick are Georgia's two seaports. As of 2007, the Port of Brunswick was the sixth-busiest automobile port in the United States.

Education has also remained a dominant part of the regional economy, and Georgia Southern University's flagship campus in Statesboro is by far the largest institution in terms of campus enrollment. Along with its Armstrong and Hinesville campuses, Georgia Southern's combined economic impact surpasses $1.1 billion annually. Other leading institutions in the region are Savannah State University, South University, Georgia Tech Savannah, Savannah Technical College, Ralston College, and Savannah College of Art and Design, all contributing to Coastal Georgia's development. In the southern part of the region, the College of Coastal Georgia serves Brunswick and its metropolitan economy.

== Transportation ==
Coastal Georgia is mainly served by two airports: Savannah/Hilton Head International Airport and Brunswick Golden Isles Airport. Brunswick's airport provides flights to Hartsfield–Jackson Atlanta International Airport, served by Delta Air.

In the southern part of the region, three federal highways pass through metropolitan Brunswick: U.S. Route 17, U.S. Route 341, and U.S. Route 25. In the Savannah area of Coastal Georgia, interstates 16, 95, and 516 run through the city; U.S. Route 80 and U.S. Route 17 also both run through Savannah. Additionally, Amtrak provides rail services throughout the region.
