= Justin Powell =

American basketball player (born 2001)

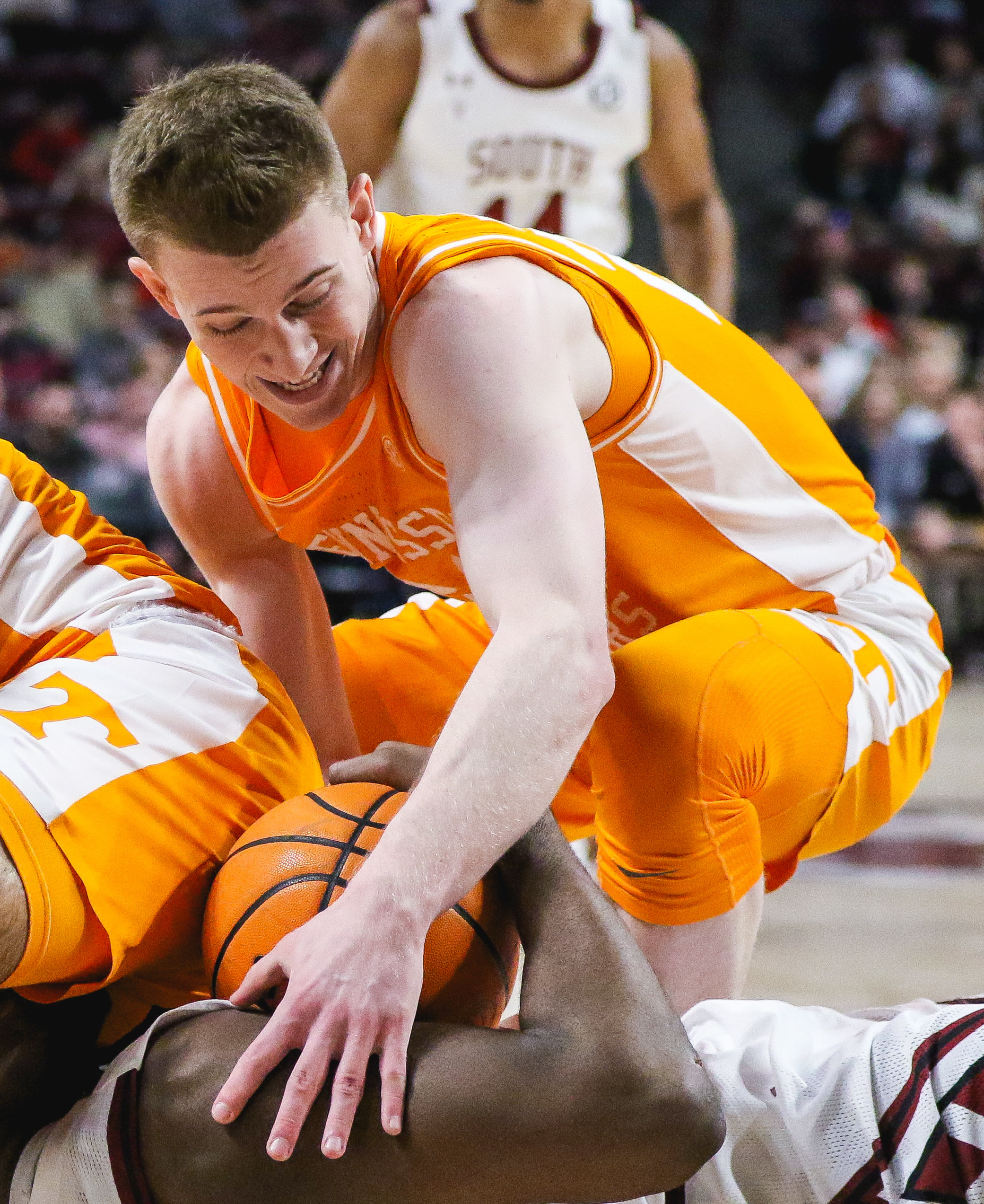
- Powell with Tennessee in 2022

No. 22 – Texas Legends
- Position: Shooting guard
- League: NBA G League

Personal information
- Born: May 9, 2001 (age 25) Prospect, Kentucky, U.S.
- Listed height: 6 ft 5 in (1.96 m)
- Listed weight: 197 lb (89 kg)

Career information
- High school: Trinity (Louisville, Kentucky); Montverde Academy (Montverde, Florida); North Oldham (Goshen, Kentucky)
- College: Auburn (2020–2021); Tennessee (2021–2022); Washington State (2022–2023)
- NBA draft: 2023: undrafted
- Playing career: 2023–present

Career history
- 2023–2024: Cleveland Charge
- 2024–2025: Stockton Kings
- 2025–present: Texas Legends
- Stats at NBA.com
- Stats at Basketball Reference

Justin Tyler Powell (born May 9, 2001) is an American professional basketball player for the Texas Legends of the NBA G League. He played college basketball player for the Washington State Cougars, the Tennessee Volunteers and Auburn Tigers.

== High school career ==
Powell played basketball for Trinity High School in Louisville, Kentucky, where he was teammates with Jay Scrubb and David Johnson. For his junior season, he transferred to Montverde Academy in Montverde, Florida, one of the top teams in the nation. Powell returned to his home state, moving to North Oldham High School in Goshen, Kentucky, for his senior season. He averaged 22.2 points and 8.5 rebounds per game, but his season was cut short by a sports hernia that required surgery. He committed to playing college basketball for Auburn over offers from Georgia Tech, Ohio State and Xavier.

== College career ==
On December 4, 2020, Powell posted a freshman season-high 26 points, shooting 7-of-9 from three-point range, and nine assists in a 90–81 win over South Alabama. In his next game, on December 12, he recorded 26 points and eight rebounds in a 74–71 win over Memphis. Powell was named Southeastern Conference (SEC) Freshman of the Week two days later. During a game against Texas A&M on January 2, 2021, he suffered a serious concussion, causing him to miss the remainder of the season. In 10 games as a freshman, he averaged 11.7 points, 6.1 rebounds and 4.7 assists per game. For his sophomore season, Powell transferred to Tennessee. He averaged 3.7 points and 1.5 rebounds per game. Powell transferred to Washington State for his junior season. He averaged 10.4 points, 3.9 rebounds and a team-high 2.8 assists per game. Following the season, he declared for the 2023 NBA draft.

== Professional career ==
=== Cleveland Charge (2023–2024) ===
After going undrafted in the 2023 NBA draft, Powell joined the Miami Heat for NBA Summer League. and on September 13, 2023, he signed with the Cleveland Cavaliers. However, he was waived on October 21 and one week later, signed with the Cleveland Charge of the NBA G League.

=== Stockton Kings (2024–2025) ===
On September 25, 2024, Powell signed with the Sacramento Kings, but was waived the same day. On October 27, he joined the Stockton Kings.

=== Texas Legends (2025–present) ===
On January 15, 2025, Powell was traded to the Texas Legends.

== Career statistics ==
Legend
GP	Games played	GS	Games started	MPG	Minutes per game
FG%	Field goal percentage	3P%	3-point field goal percentage	FT%	Free throw percentage
RPG	Rebounds per game	APG	Assists per game	SPG	Steals per game
BPG	Blocks per game	PPG	Points per game	**Bold**	Career high

=== College ===
Year	Team	GP	GS	MPG	FG%	3P%	FT%	RPG	APG	SPG	BPG	PPG
2020–21	Auburn	10	7	27.6	**.429**	**.442**	.765	**6.1**	**4.7**	**.9**	–	**11.7**
2021–22	Tennessee	30	1	14.1	.392	.381	.733	1.5	.7	.3	**.2**	3.7
2022–23	Washington State	**34**	**34**	**33.8**	.408	.426	**.811**	3.9	2.8	.7	.1	10.4
Career		74	42	25.0	.408	.419	.779	3.2	2.2	0.6	.1	7.8
