= Brantley County High School =

Public high school in Nahunta, Georgia, United States

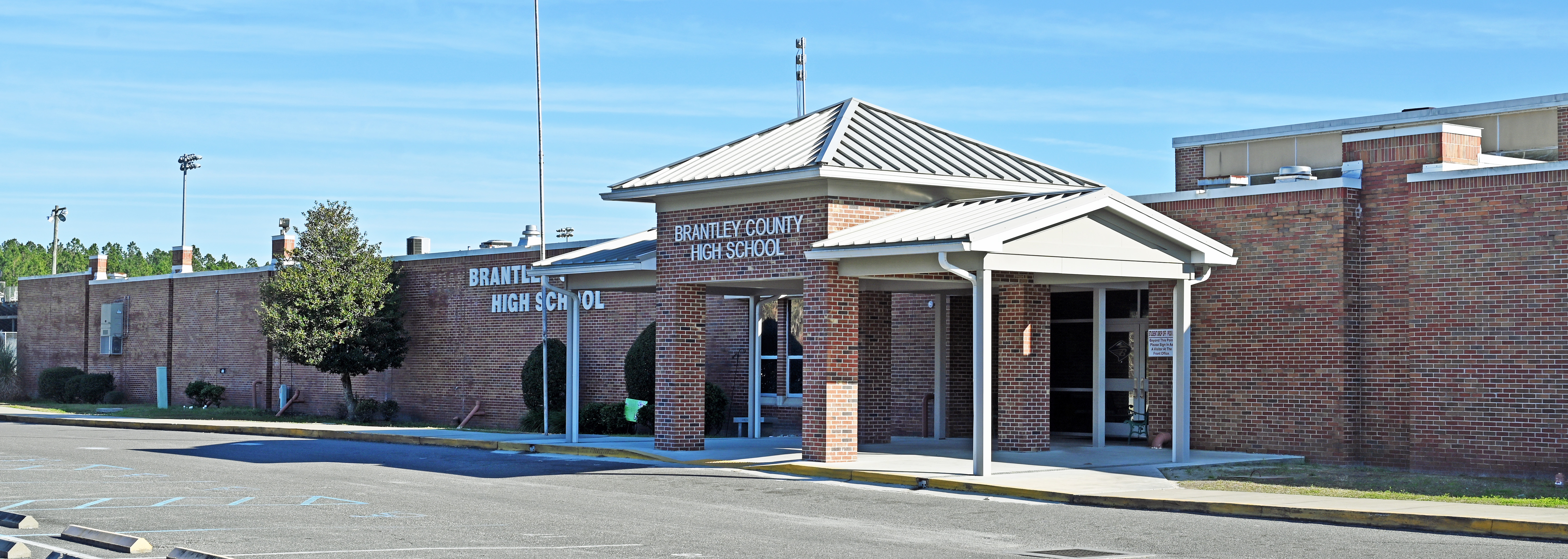
- Brantley County High School in 2023

Location
- 10804 Highway 82; Nahunta, Georgia 31553; United States
- Coordinates: 31°11′46″N 82°1′46″W

Information
- School type: Public high school
- School district: Brantley County School District
- Superintendent: Kim Morgan
- CEEB code: 112225
- Principal: Todd
- Teaching staff: 62.80 (FTE)
- Grades: 9–12
- Gender: Co-education
- Enrollment: 949 (2023–2024)
- Student to teacher ratio: 15.11
- Hours in school day: 7:55am – 3:00 pm
- Colors: Blue and gold
- Slogan: “ Together We Fly “
- Athletics conference: GHSA Region 1-AAA
- Sports: Baseball, basketball, cheerleading, cross-country, football, wrestling, golf, soccer, softball, tennis, track, field, fishing and marching band
- Team name: Herons
- Rival: Pierce County High School
- Accreditation: Southern Association of Colleges and Schools
- Yearbook: Edge
- Website: bchs.brantley.k12.ga.us

Brantley County High School is a public high school located in Nahunta, Georgia, United States. The school is part of the Brantley County School District, which serves Brantley County.

== Notable alumni ==
- Jaylin Williams (2019), basketball player for the Grand Rapids Gold
