= J'Von McCormick =

American basketball player

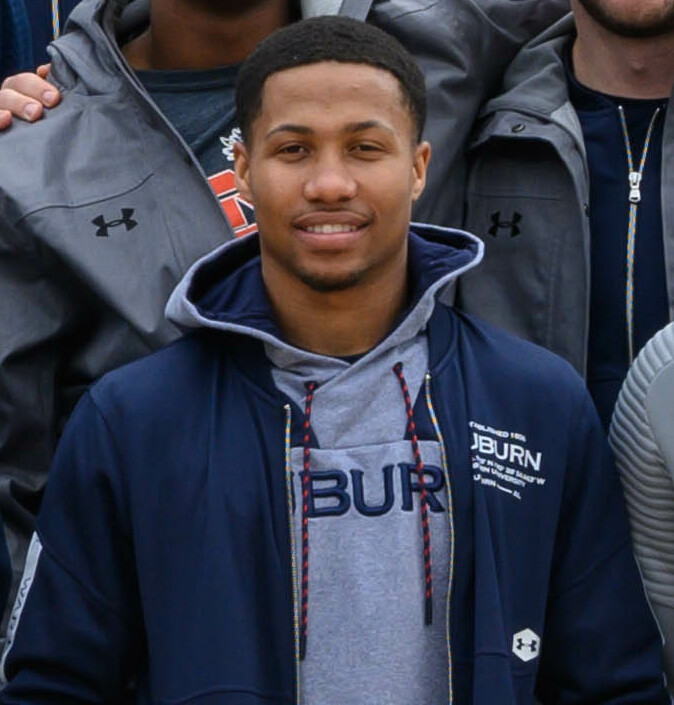
- McCormick in 2019

CS Maristes
- Position: Point guard
- League: Israeli Basketball Premier League

Personal information
- Born: June 8, 1997 (age 29)
- Listed height: 6 ft 0 in (1.83 m)
- Listed weight: 185 lb (84 kg)

Career information
- High school: Mayde Creek (Houston, Texas)
- College: Lee (2016–2018); Auburn (2018–2020)
- NBA draft: 2020: undrafted
- Playing career: 2021–present

Career history
- 2021–2022: Kocaeli BŞB Kağıtspor
- 2024: Foolad Hormozgan
- 2025–2026: CS Maristes
- 2026: Rahoveci 029
- 2026-present: Hapoel Holon

J'Von McCormick (born June 8, 1997) is an American professional basketball player for Hapoel Holon of the Israeli Basketball Premier League. He played college basketball for the Lee Runnin' Rebels and the Auburn Tigers.

== Early life and high school career ==
McCormick attended Mayde Creek High School in Houston, Texas. As a senior, he averaged 25.6 points, 6.9 rebounds and 5.1 assists while shooting 52 percent from the floor. McCormick was named District 29-6A Offensive MVP. He played AAU basketball for Westside Force. McCormick received several Division I scholarship offers out of high school, including Utah, but committed to Lee College.

== College career ==
McCormick played two seasons at Lee College. He posted 4.9 points, 2.1 assists and 2.0 rebounds per game as a freshman. As a sophomore, he averaged 18.5 points, 6.4 assists and 5.3 rebounds per game. He was third-leading scorer in the Region XIV Athletic Conference. On June 13, 2018, McCormick committed to Auburn to serve as a backup to Jared Harper. In the NCAA Tournament Sweet 16, he finished with 10 points, two assists, and two steals in a 97–80 win against North Carolina. He averaged 4.1 points, 1.4 assists, 0.9 rebounds and 0.8 steals per game as a junior, helping the Tigers reach the Final Four. McCormick received Auburn's Sixth Man Award. On January 4, 2020, McCormick scored a career-high 28 points in an 80–68 win against Mississippi State. As a result, he was named SEC player of the week on January 6. As a senior, McCormick averaged 11.7 points, 4 rebounds and 4.5 assists per game.

== Professional career ==
On August 6, 2020, McCormick signed his first professional contract with BC Odesa of the Ukrainian Basketball SuperLeague. In October 2021, he signed with Kocaeli BŞB Kağıtspor of the Turkish Basketball First League. On January 18, 2025, he signed with CS Maristes of the Lebanese Basketball League. On February 2, 2026, he signed with Rahoveci 029 of the Kosovo Basketball Superleague. On May 19, 2026 he signed with Hapoel Holon of the Israeli Basketball Premier League.

== Career statistics ==
Legend
GP	Games played	GS	Games started	MPG	Minutes per game
FG%	Field goal percentage	3P%	3-point field goal percentage	FT%	Free throw percentage
RPG	Rebounds per game	APG	Assists per game	SPG	Steals per game
BPG	Blocks per game	PPG	Points per game	**Bold**	Career high

=== College ===
==== NCAA Division I ====
Year	Team	GP	GS	MPG	FG%	3P%	FT%	RPG	APG	SPG	BPG	PPG
2018–19	Auburn	**39**	0	12.2	**.525**	**.500**	**.615**	.9	1.4	.8	**.1**	4.1
2019–20	Auburn	31	**31**	**31.4**	.384	.305	.581	**4.0**	**4.5**	**1.1**	**.1**	**11.7**
Career		70	31	20.7	.421	.331	.590	2.3	2.7	.9	.1	7.5

==== JUCO ====
Year	Team	GP	GS	MPG	FG%	3P%	FT%	RPG	APG	SPG	BPG	PPG
2016–17	Lee	**31**	7	–	**.527**	.333	.534	2.0	2.1	1.3	.2	4.9
2017–18	Lee	28	**28**	–	.428	**.364**	**.648**	**5.3**	**6.4**	**1.6**	**.5**	**18.5**
Career		59	35	–	.448	.359	.622	3.6	4.1	1.4	.3	11.4

== Personal life ==
He is the son of Carol McCormick.
