= Jaylin Williams (basketball, born 2000) =

American basketball player (born 2000)

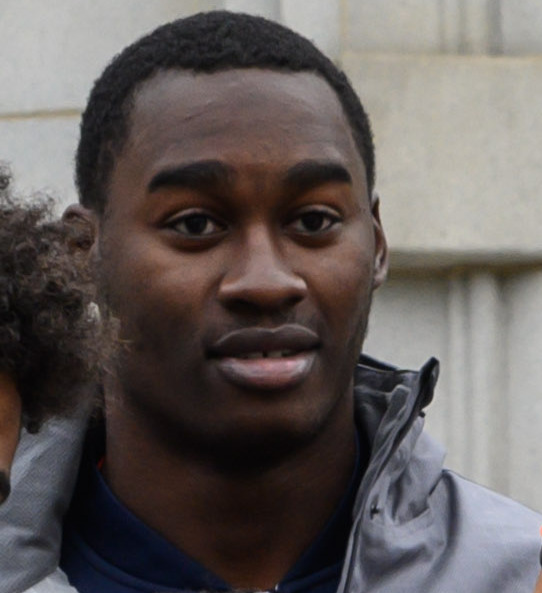
- Williams in 2019

No. 2 – Brisbane Bullets
- Position: Power forward
- League: NBL

Personal information
- Born: July 26, 2000 (age 26) Nahunta, Georgia, U.S.
- Listed height: 6 ft 8 in (2.03 m)
- Listed weight: 245 lb (111 kg)

Career information
- High school: Brantley County (Nahunta, Georgia)
- College: Auburn (2019–2024)
- NBA draft: 2024: undrafted
- Playing career: 2024–present

Career history
- 2024–2025: Grand Rapids Gold
- 2025: Winnipeg Sea Bears
- 2025–2026: Stockton Kings
- 2026: Saskatoon Mamba
- 2026–present: Brisbane Bullets

Career highlights
- Second-team All-SEC (2024)
- Stats at NBA.com
- Stats at Basketball Reference

Jaylin Williams (born July 26, 2000) is an American professional basketball player for the Brisbane Bullets of the Australian National Basketball League (NBL). He played college basketball for the Auburn Tigers.

== High school career ==
Williams attended Brantley County at Nahunta, Georgia, where he averaged 25 points and 14 rebounds per game and was a first team all-state selection as a junior and senior.

== College career ==
Williams played college basketball for the Auburn Tigers where he played in 141 games and averaged 9.3 points, 3.9 rebounds, and 1.6 assists in 21.4 minutes, where he ended up first all-time in career games played and in career wins with 114.

In his last season, Williams averaged 12.4 points, 4.4 rebounds and two assists, while shooting a career high 39.5 percent from three and a career high 57.4 percent from the field. He scored 20-plus points eight times while shooting 70 percent or better from the field in 10 different games, including seven times in SEC play and that season, he led his team to the Cancun Challenge Riviera Division Championship title, beating Bradley and Northwestern with him being named Tournament MVP.

== Professional career ==
After going undrafted in the 2024 NBA draft, Williams joined the Denver Nuggets for the 2024 NBA Summer League. He signed with the Nuggets on July 31 and was waived on October 8. He subsequently joined the Grand Rapids Gold of the NBA G League for the 2024–25 season.

On April 1, 2025, Williams signed with the Winnipeg Sea Bears of the Canadian Elite Basketball League (CEBL). In July 2025, he joined the Dallas Mavericks for the 2025 NBA Summer League.

On September 26, 2025, Williams signed with the Sacramento Kings. He was waived the next day and subsequently joined the Stockton Kings for the 2025–26 NBA G League season.

On May 1, 2026, Williams signed with the Saskatoon Mamba of the CEBL. In July 2026, he joined the Minnesota Timberwolves for the 2026 NBA Summer League.

On July 29, 2026, Williams signed with the Brisbane Bullets of the Australian National Basketball League (NBL) for the 2026–27 season.

== Personal life ==
The son of Shantel Williams, he graduated with a bachelor's degree in kinesiology in May 2023.
