= Samir Doughty =

American basketball player (born 1997)

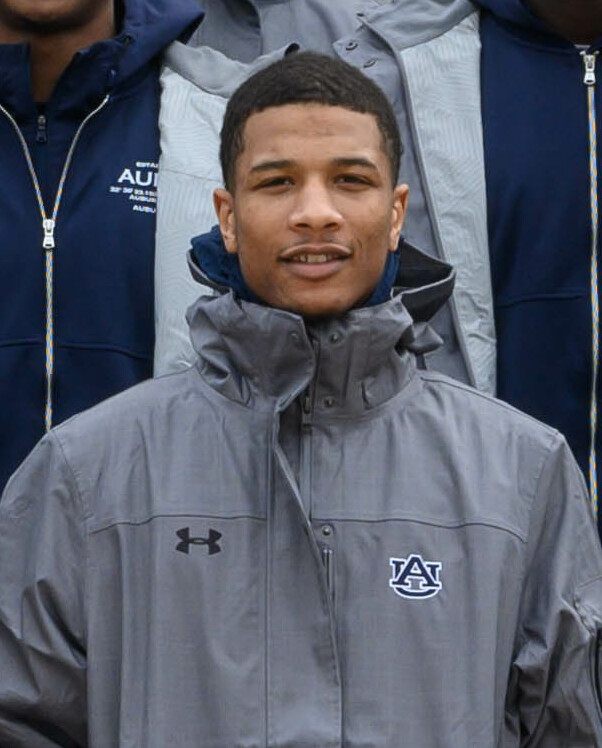
- Doughty in 2019

Personal information
- Born: January 2, 1997 (age 29)
- Listed height: 6 ft 4 in (1.93 m)
- Listed weight: 195 lb (88 kg)

Career information
- High school: Mathematics, Civics and Sciences (Philadelphia, Pennsylvania)
- College: VCU (2016–2017); Auburn (2018–2020)
- NBA draft: 2020: undrafted
- Playing career: 2021–2022
- Position: Guard

Career history
- 2021–2022: Lakeland Magic

Career highlights
- First-team All-SEC – Coaches (2020); Second-team All-SEC – AP (2020)

Samir Doughty (born January 2, 1997) is an American former professional basketball player. He played college basketball for the VCU Rams and the Auburn Tigers.

== High school career ==
Doughty attended Mathematics, Civics and Sciences Charter School in Philadelphia, Pennsylvania. In middle school, he played for the Philly Pride AAU team. Doughty was a two-time first-team all-league selection in high school and led the Mighty Elephants to back-to-back appearances in the league playoffs. He averaged 16.8 points per game as a junior. As a senior, Doughty averaged 24.9 points per game. Doughty originally committed to St. John's out of high school.

== College career ==
Doughty redshirted his freshman season at VCU. He had a season-high 23 points to go with nine assists and seven rebounds against Duquesne. Doughty scored 17 points in the Atlantic 10 Conference Tournament against Richmond. He helped the Rams reach the NCAA Tournament, where they lost to St. Mary's in a game in which Doughty scored nine points. As a redshirt freshman, Doughty averaged 9.0 points, 3.6 rebounds and 2.1 assists per game, shooting 40.9 percent from the floor and 28.4 percent from three-point range. After the season, he decided to transfer to Auburn after coach Will Wade left to become the coach of LSU. In Auburn's trip to Italy, Doughty averaged 6.0 points, 3.7 rebounds, 3.3 steals and 2.0 assists per game. After sitting out a season, he helped lead Auburn to the Final Four. In the Final Four matchup against Virginia, Doughty scored 13 points but fouled Kyle Guy with 0.6 seconds remaining in a 63–62 loss. Doughty was the Tigers’ top three-point shooter at 42.5 percent as a junior while averaging 7.3 points and 3.5 rebounds per game.

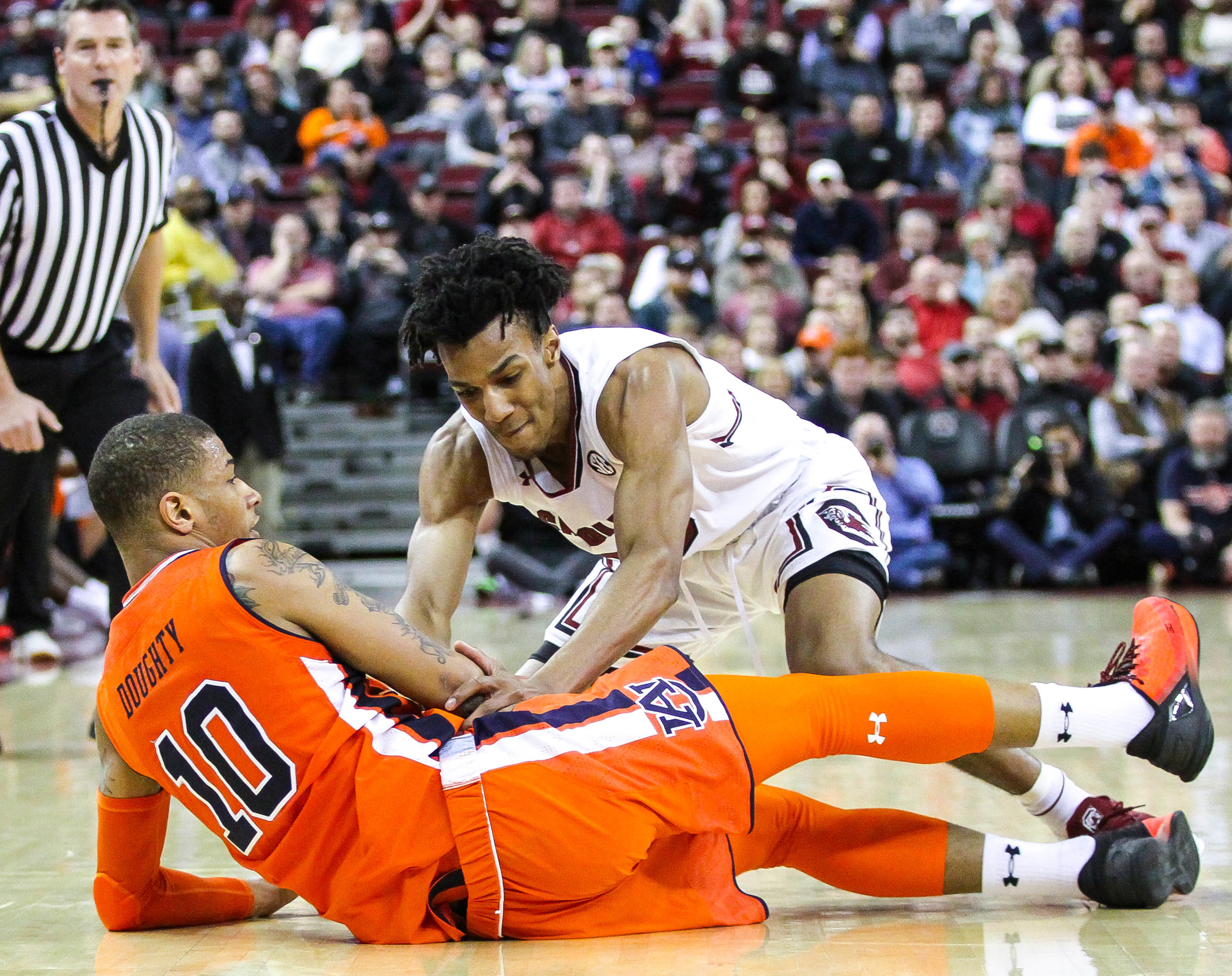
Doughty fights for the ball with A. J. Lawson of South Carolina

Doughty scored a career-high 33 points in a 116–70 win over Cal State Northridge on November 15, 2019. On February 4, Doughty scored 23 points and hit two clinching free throws in a 79–76 overtime win at Arkansas, despite having a virus and not practicing.

At the end of the regular season in his senior year, Doughty was named to the All-SEC First Team by the coaches and the All-SEC Second Team by the Associated Press. Doughty averaged a team-leading 16.7 points, 3.9 rebounds and 2.7 assists per game during a 25–6 season.

== Professional career ==
Doughty was selected with the 22nd pick in the 2021 NBA G League draft by the Iowa Wolves. He was subsequently traded to the Lakeland Magic. He appeared in 17 games for the Magic, averaging 8.1 points, 3.7 rebounds and 2.0 assists, before being waived on January 31, 2022.

Doughty was acquired by the Fort Wayne Mad Ants on February 14, but waived on February 24.

== Career statistics ==
Legend
GP	Games played	GS	Games started	MPG	Minutes per game
FG%	Field goal percentage	3P%	3-point field goal percentage	FT%	Free throw percentage
RPG	Rebounds per game	APG	Assists per game	SPG	Steals per game
BPG	Blocks per game	PPG	Points per game	**Bold**	Career high

*	Led NCAA Division I

=== College ===
Year	Team	GP	GS	MPG	FG%	3P%	FT%	RPG	APG	SPG	BPG	PPG
2015–16	VCU	Redshirt										
2016–17	VCU	35	15	23.2	.409	.284	.766	3.6	2.1	.9	**.1**	9.0
2017–18	Auburn	Transfer										
2018–19	Auburn	**40***	27	24.2	**.458**	**.425**	**.785**	3.5	1.7	**1.4**	**.1**	7.3
2019–20	Auburn	31	**31**	**33.3**	.412	.335	.767	**3.9**	**2.7**	1.2	**.1**	**16.7**
Career		106	73	26.5	.423	.350	.770	3.6	2.1	1.2	.1	10.6
