= Out-of-Door Academy =

Private school in Sarasota, Florida, US

The Out-of-Door Academy
- Sarasota, Florida; United States

Information
- School type: Independent, Preparatory
- Established: 1924
- CEEB code: 101579
- Head of school: Debra Otey
- Teaching staff: 75.4 (on an FTE basis)A0301145
- Grades: Pre-K–12
- Gender: Coed
- Enrollment: 718 (2015-2016)
- Student to teacher ratio: 9.3
- Colors: Navy, white
- Athletics: FHSAA 1A (SSAC for football)
- Mascot: Thor
- Team name: Thunder
- Newspaper: The Bolt
- Yearbook: The Sandpiper
- Website: http://www.oda.edu/

The Out-of-Door Academy is a college preparatory school in Sarasota, Florida. It serves students in pre-kindergarten through grade 12 on three campuses in the Sarasota area, one on Siesta Key, one off of Clark Road, and one in Lakewood Ranch, the Upper School Uihlein Campus.

== History ==
The Out-of-Door School was established in 1924 by Fanneal Harrison and Catherine Gavin, followers of Belgian progressive education pioneer Ovide Decroly. Classes and free time were spent outside on the school's 20-acre (81,000 m^{2}) campus on Siesta Key. Wooden cabins were used as classrooms during inclement weather and as dormitories. Over time, the classes were held indoors. In 1977, the school was purchased by 120 school families and transformed into a nonprofit organization, renaming it Out-of-Door Academy.

The Lakewood Ranch campus was established in 1996. The Uihlein family donated the land that would later become the Upper School campus. Seventh and 8th grades were moved to the new campus in 2000, and in 2008 the campus became known as the Uihlein Campus at Lakewood Ranch. The 6th grade was later moved to the Uihlein Campus in 2012.

The Out-of-Door Academy is accredited by the Florida Council of Independent Schools and the Florida Kindergarten Council. The school is a member of the Cum Laude Society, the National Association of Independent Schools, the Council for Spiritual and Ethical Education, and the Council for Advancement and Support of Education.

== Campus ==
- Out of Door School
- U.S. National Register of Historic Places
- Location within Florida
- Location: Sarasota, Florida
- Coordinates: 27°17′9″N 82°33′38″W
- Built: 1924
- Architect: Ralph Twitchell
- NRHP reference No.: 94001276
- Added to NRHP: October 28, 1994

The 5-acre Siesta Key Lower School Campus is on the National Register of Historic Places as Out-of-Door School. Located on Siesta Key in Sarasota County, FL, the Lower Campus is located on a barrier island. The 90-acre (360,000 m2) Uihlein Campus, home to the Middle and Upper Schools is located in Lakewood Ranch. In 2017, the School partnered with Mote Marine Laboratory to create a Marine Biology classroom equipped with six oversized aquariums and an interactive touch tank for students. ODA has installed more than 550 solar panels throughout the Historic Siesta Key Campus, one of the biggest solar projects in the region.

Siesta Key Campus was renovated between 2008 and 2021, which included construction of a three-story academic building and covered athletic pavilion.

The 90-acre (360,000 m2) Uihlein Campus is located at Lakewood Ranch. The Uihlein Campus is home to the Middle and Upper Schools, serving grades 6-12.

The Uihlein Campus consists of 12 main buildings which include a performing arts center which houses The Black Box Theater, the Savidge/Bowers Library, two Dart STEM labs, an augmented reality lab, makerspace labs, the Dick Vitale Family Student Center, Petrik Family Commons, in addition to classrooms. Athletics facilities include the Petrik Thunderdome, Gelbman Family Wellness Center, Uihlein Sports Complex, the Dietrich Family Sports Complex and Taylor Emmons Memorial Baseball Field, Malisoff Tennis Center, Thunder Athletic Complex, and Fox Field House.

Construction began in 2008 for a performing arts center at the Uihlein Campus at Lakewood Ranch, and the center opened in 2009. Renovation of the Siesta Key campus and construction of new athletic facilities also began in 2008.

Construction of a Middle School Campus (Dart STEM Center, Summer Breeze Center) was completed in 2020 adding more than 13,500 square feet of instructional space. The new building includes a STEM lab, augmented reality/AV lab, makerspace, art studio, and student commons in addition to flexible classrooms and learning spaces for core coursework. ODA installed 705 solar panels at the Uihlein campus in 2020 reducing energy consumption 65%; an additional 905 panels in 2021 further reduced commercial energy reliance.

== Curriculum ==
The academy's curriculum is a liberal arts program that includes mathematics, English, science, social studies, Foreign Language including Spanish, Latin, and Mandarin Chinese, and music and visual and performing arts. Advanced Placement (AP) and honors courses are available.

== STEM science ==
On September 2, 2014, ODA school leaders and lead donors broke ground on two new facilities: the Dick Vitale Family Student Center and Dart Foundation STEM Center. The Dick Vitale Family Student Center was modeled after college-like campus centers where students could congregate study, collaborate, and socialize. The Dart Foundation STEM Center was designed to provide project-based learning lessons that integrated sciences, technology, engineering, and mathematics.

== Athletics ==
The Out-of-Door Academy’s 2021 Baseball Team won the FHSAA Class 2A state title 2018 Boys Tennis Team earned the FHSAA Class 1A state title. ODA's Football team won the 2023 SSAA 4A State Championship as well. ODA holds 12 state champion titles in individual sports, including tennis, golf, and track & field.

== Extracurricular activities ==
Student groups and activities include art club, community service club, drama club, National Honor Society, newspaper, Relay for Life, science/environmental club, student council, Tri-M Music Honors Society, Key Club, Invisible Children, and yearbook. Upper school students require 100 hours of community service in to graduate.

The Out-of-Door Academy athletic teams, known as the Thunder, compete in interscholastic competition in baseball, basketball, cheerleading, cross country, football, golf, lacrosse, sailing, soccer, softball, swimming, tennis, track & field, and volleyball.

== Accolades ==
In 2006, Out-of-Door Academy was recognized as a Cum Laude Society School. Out-of-Door Academy was voted "Best Private School" in 2003, 2004, and 2005 by Sarasota magazine.
