= Wes Flanigan =

American basketball coach (born 1974)

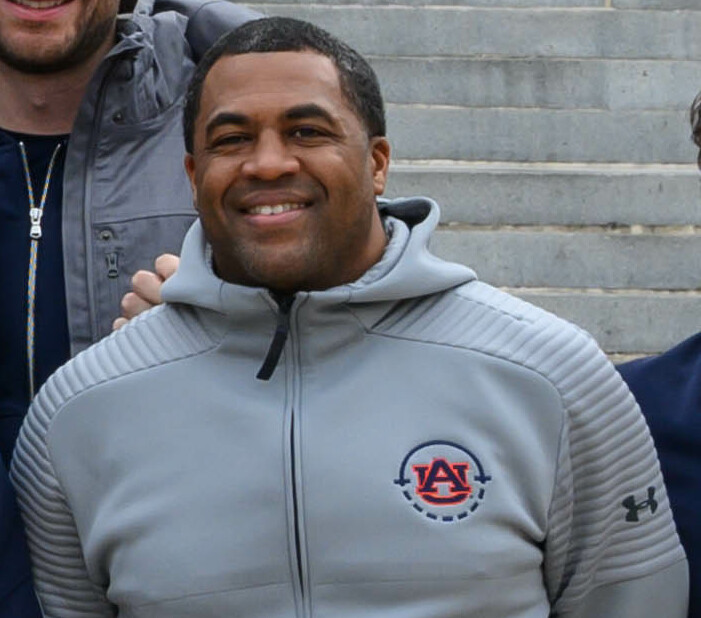
- Flanigan with Auburn in 2019

Current position
- Title: Assistant coach
- Team: Georgia Tech
- Conference: ACC

Biographical details
- Born: April 19, 1974 (age 52); Little Rock, Arkansas, U.S.

Playing career
- 1993–1997: Auburn

Coaching career (HC unless noted)
- 2000–2004: NW Mississippi CC (asst.)
- 2004–2008: Little Rock (asst.)
- 2008–2010: UAB (asst.)
- 2010–2012: Nebraska (asst.)
- 2012–2015: Mississippi State (asst.)
- 2015–2016: Little Rock (asst.)
- 2016–2018: Little Rock
- 2018–2023: Auburn (asst.)
- 2023–2026: Ole Miss (asst.)
- 2026–present: Georgia Tech (asst.)

Head coaching record
- Overall: 23–42 (.354)

Accomplishments and honors

Awards
- USBWA Most Courageous Award (1997)

Wes Flanigan (born April 19, 1974) is an American college basketball coach and current assistant coach for the Georgia Tech Yellow Jackets men's basketball team. He is the former head coach for the Little Rock Trojans men's basketball team.

== Playing career ==
Flanigan played at Auburn under Cliff Ellis, where he was an all-SEC selection his junior season. Flanigan finished his career second all-time in assists with 573, and scored 1,228 points, good for 22nd all-time.

== Coaching career ==
Flanigan began his coaching career with a four-year stint at Northwest Mississippi Community College as an assistant coach, before joining Little Rock as an assistant for his first go-around. He followed that up with assistant coaching stops at UAB, Nebraska, and Mississippi St. before returning to Little Rock as an assistant under Chris Beard, where he was part of the Trojans' 2016 NCAA tournament team which defeated Purdue in the first round.

When Beard left for the head coaching position at Texas Tech, Flanigan was elevated to the head coaching position.

In March 2018, the Trojans fired Flanigan after his second season with the team. A month later, on April 16, he was hired by Bruce Pearl to be an assistant at his alma mater, Auburn.

== Head coaching record ==
=== NCAA Division I ===
Record table
Season	Team	Overall	Conference	Standing	Postseason
Little Rock Trojans (Sun Belt) (2016–2018)
2016–17	Little Rock	15–17	6–12	10th	
2017–18	Little Rock	7–25	4–14	12th	
Little Rock:		22–42 (.344)	10–26 (.278)		
Total:		22–42 (.344)			
National champion Postseason invitational champion Conference regular season champion Conference regular season and conference tournament champion Division regular season champion Division regular season and conference tournament champion Conference tournament champion
