= Hoboken, Georgia =

City in Georgia, United States

- City
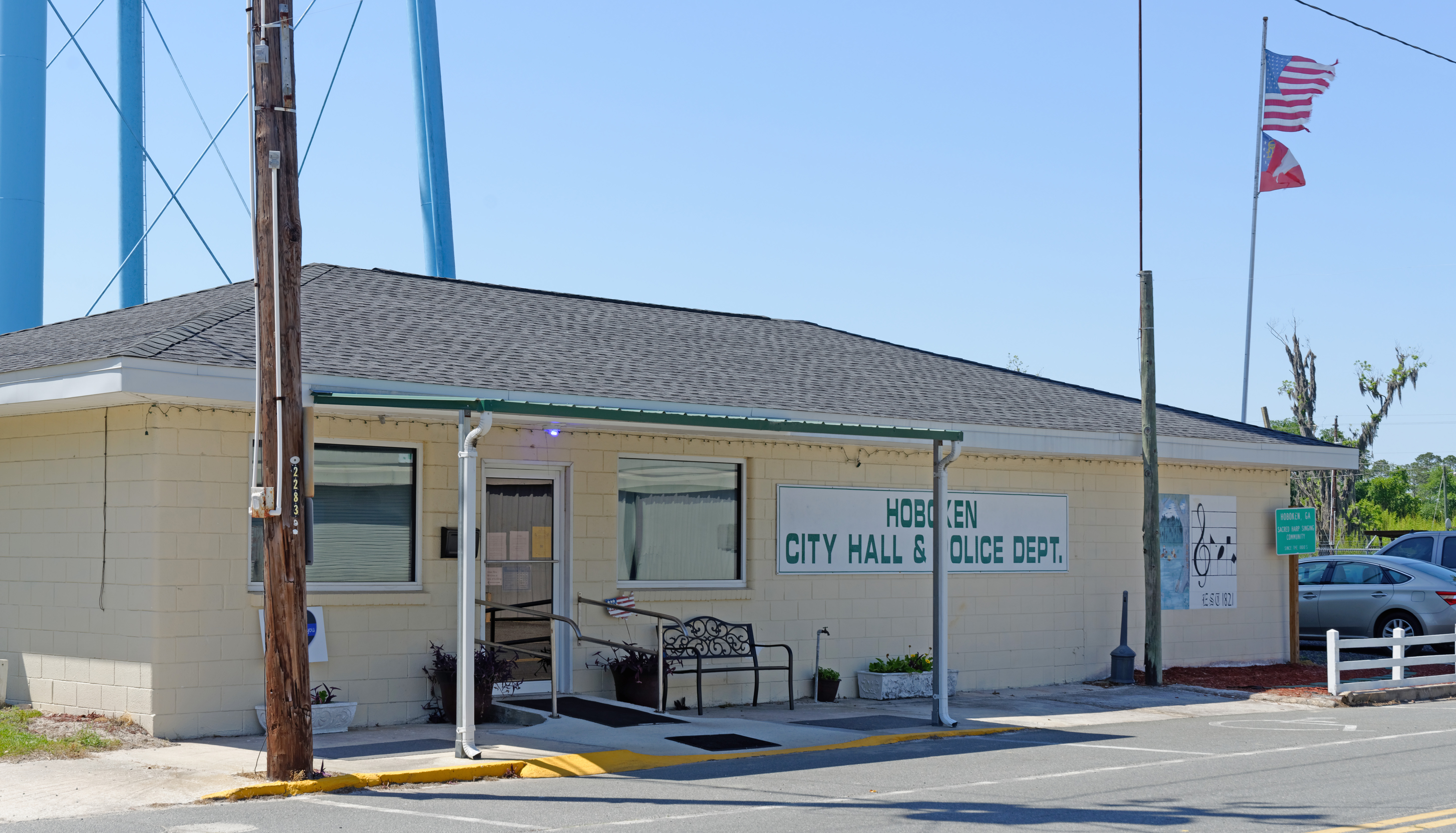

- Location in Brantley County and the state of Georgia
- Coordinates: 31°10′58″N 82°8′2″W
- Country: United States
- State: Georgia
- County: Brantley

Area
  - Total: 3.44 sq mi (8.92 km^{2})
  - Land: 3.43 sq mi (8.88 km^{2})
  - Water: 0.015 sq mi (0.04 km^{2})
- Elevation: 130 ft (40 m)

Population (2020)
  - Total: 480
  - Density: 140.0/sq mi (54.06/km^{2})
- Time zone: UTC-5 (Eastern (EST))
  - Summer (DST): UTC-4 (EDT)
- ZIP code: 31542
- Area code: 912
- FIPS code: 13-39216
- GNIS feature ID: 0331999

Hoboken is a city in Brantley County, Georgia, United States. The city's name most likely is a transfer from Hoboken, New Jersey. As of the 2020 census, the city had a population of 480.

== History ==
The Georgia General Assembly incorporated the place as the City of Hoboken in 1920. Hoboken served as the first county seat of Brantley County from the county's formation in 1920 until 1923 when the seat was transferred to Nahunta.

== Geography ==
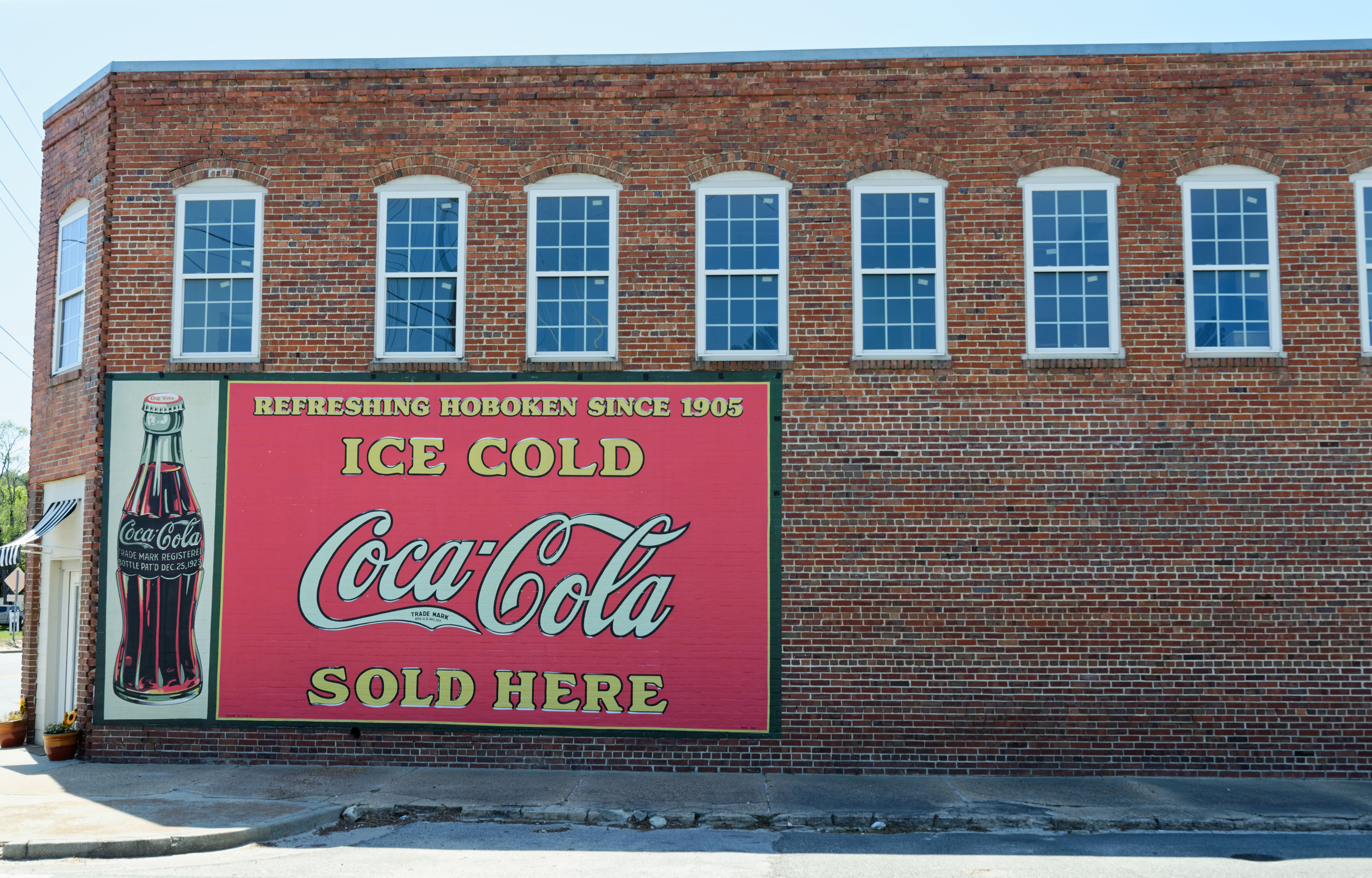
Building at the corner of US Route 82 and Palm Street

Hoboken is located in western Brantley County at 31°10′58″N 82°8′2″W (31.182720, -82.133891). U.S. Route 82 (called Main Street) passes through the city, leading east 9 miles (14 km) to Nahunta, the county seat, and west 14 miles (23 km) to Waycross.

According to the United States Census Bureau, Hoboken has a total area of 3.4 square miles (8.9 km^{2}), of which 0.015 square miles (0.04 km^{2}), or 0.48%, is water.

== Demographics ==
Historical population
Census	Pop.	Note	%±
1930	398		—
1940	386		−3.0%
1950	492		27.5%
1960	552		12.2%
1970	424		−23.2%
1980	514		21.2%
1990	440		−14.4%
2000	463		5.2%
2010	528		14.0%
2020	480		−9.1%
U.S. Decennial Census

In 2020, the city had a population of 480, down from 528 at the 2010 census.

== Cultural events ==
Hoboken has a continuous tradition of periodic singings from the Sacred Harp that has continued for over 150 years. These currently include monthly singings and an annual convention.

Twin Oaks Park, located 4 miles (6 km) outside of Hoboken (and with a Hoboken mailing address), hosts two bluegrass conventions every year. It is a privately owned campground, where people from all over can bring their RV's, pop-ups, and listen to the melodic sounds of bluegrass music.

== See also ==
- List of county seats in Georgia (U.S. state)
