= Nahunta, Georgia =

- City
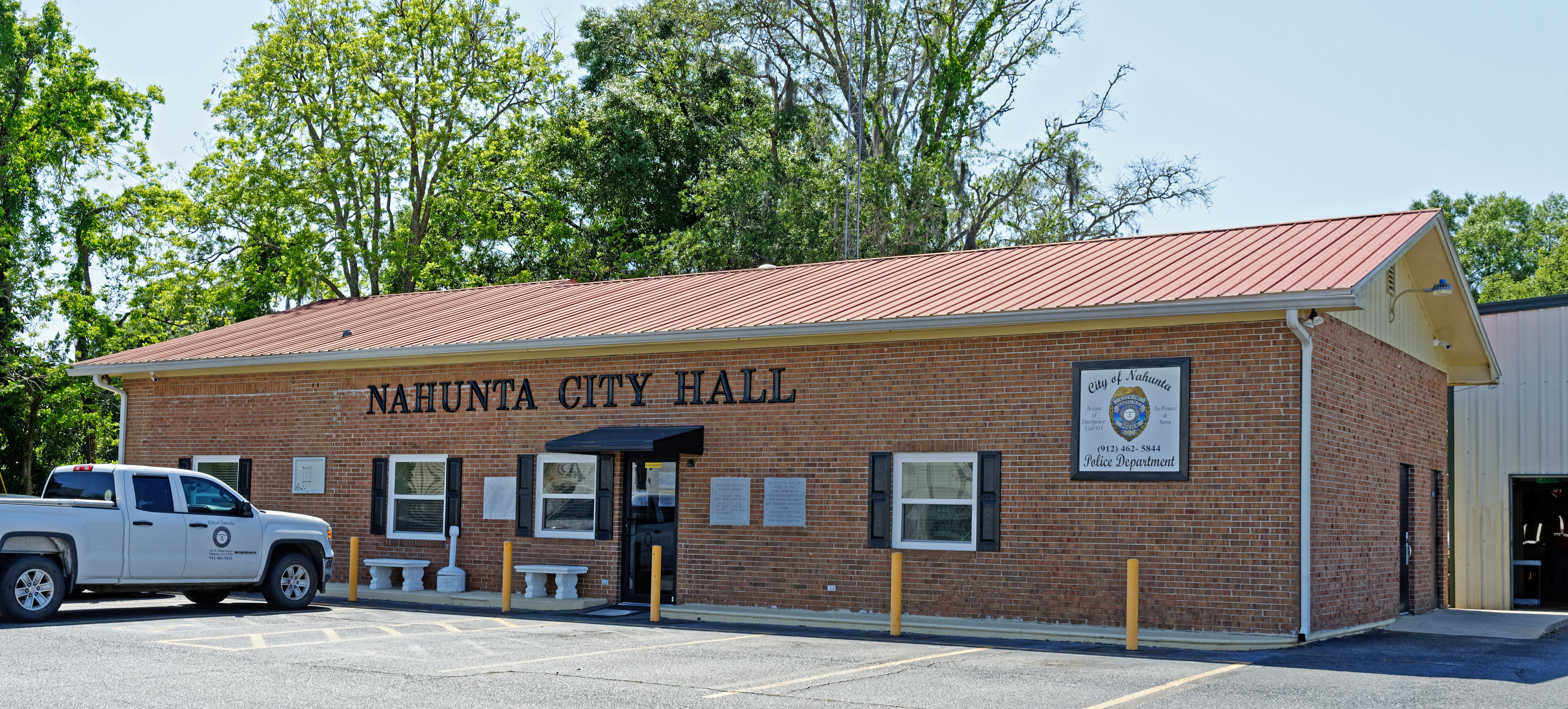
- Nahunta City Hall

- Seal

- Location in Brantley County and the state of Georgia
- Coordinates: 31°12′16″N 81°58′56″W
- Country: United States
- State: Georgia
- County: Brantley

Area
  - Total: 2.83 sq mi (7.34 km^{2})
  - Land: 2.82 sq mi (7.30 km^{2})
  - Water: 0.015 sq mi (0.04 km^{2})
- Elevation: 66 ft (20 m)

Population (2020)
  - Total: 1,013
  - Density: 359.4/sq mi (138.75/km^{2})
- Time zone: UTC-5 (Eastern (EST))
  - Summer (DST): UTC-4 (EDT)
- ZIP code: 31553
- Area code: 912
- FIPS code: 13-54124
- GNIS feature ID: 0319189
- Website: https://cityofnahunta.org/

Nahunta is a city in and the county seat of Brantley County, Georgia, United States. It is part of the Brunswick metropolitan area. The population was 1,013 at the 2020 census. The city is an important crossroad which is intersected by U.S. Route 82 and U.S. Route 301 in its downtown area.

== History ==
Girl grinding sugarcane to make syrup, near Nahunta, circa 1910

The area was originally called Victoria (or Victoria Mill). By 1870 there was a railroad stop with the name Nahunta in Wayne County, Georgia. Later, that area was known as Old Nahunta, and about 1.5 miles (2.4 km) east is where what is now Nahunta was established. Regarding the name: one theory has the name derived from an Iroquois word, but critics consider that unlikely since the Iroquois were not in the region. Another suggestion is that the town was renamed in 1899 for a timber executive N.A. Hunter, but the origin of the name has never been officially verified. Another theory involves nearby Wayne County, North Carolina, where a town Nahunta existed, named for Nahunta Creek.

In 1923, the seat of Brantley County was transferred to Nahunta from Hoboken.

The Georgia General Assembly incorporated Nahunta as a city in 1925.

In the late 1970s and early 1980s, Nahunta gained national attention for its armadillo festival during the first weekend in May, that included the Brantley County Armadillo Olympics and "a cookout with armadillo prominently featured on the menu".

== Geography ==
Nahunta is located at 31°12′16″N 81°58′56″W (31.204527, -81.982285).

According to the United States Census Bureau, the city has a total area of 2.8 square miles (7.3 km^{2}), of which 0.019 square miles (0.05 km^{2}), or 0.65%, is water.

=== Climate ===
According to the Köppen Climate Classification system, Nahunta has a humid subtropical climate, abbreviated "Cfa" on climate maps. The hottest temperature recorded there was 104 °F (40.0 °C) on July 7, 1990, and July 21, 2000, while the coldest temperature recorded was 3 °F (−16.1 °C) on January 21, 1985.

Climate data for Nahunta, Georgia, 1991–2020 normals, extremes 1956–present
| Month | Jan | Feb | Mar | Apr | May | Jun | Jul | Aug | Sep | Oct | Nov | Dec | Year |
|---|---|---|---|---|---|---|---|---|---|---|---|---|---|
| Record high °F (°C) | 86 (30) | 88 (31) | 90 (32) | 96 (36) | 99 (37) | 101 (38) | 104 (40) | 102 (39) | 101 (38) | 96 (36) | 89 (32) | 89 (32) | 104 (40) |
| Mean maximum °F (°C) | 77.9 (25.5) | 80.1 (26.7) | 84.3 (29.1) | 88.8 (31.6) | 93.2 (34.0) | 96.3 (35.7) | 97.2 (36.2) | 96.6 (35.9) | 93.2 (34.0) | 88.0 (31.1) | 83.0 (28.3) | 79.4 (26.3) | 98.1 (36.7) |
| Mean daily maximum °F (°C) | 62.6 (17.0) | 65.9 (18.8) | 71.7 (22.1) | 78.1 (25.6) | 84.6 (29.2) | 88.6 (31.4) | 90.9 (32.7) | 90.0 (32.2) | 85.8 (29.9) | 78.8 (26.0) | 71.9 (22.2) | 64.0 (17.8) | 77.7 (25.4) |
| Daily mean °F (°C) | 49.6 (9.8) | 52.5 (11.4) | 57.7 (14.3) | 64.0 (17.8) | 71.4 (21.9) | 77.8 (25.4) | 80.5 (26.9) | 79.9 (26.6) | 75.8 (24.3) | 67.0 (19.4) | 57.8 (14.3) | 51.6 (10.9) | 65.5 (18.6) |
| Mean daily minimum °F (°C) | 36.7 (2.6) | 39.1 (3.9) | 43.8 (6.6) | 49.9 (9.9) | 58.2 (14.6) | 67.0 (19.4) | 70.1 (21.2) | 69.8 (21.0) | 65.7 (18.7) | 55.3 (12.9) | 44.6 (7.0) | 39.2 (4.0) | 53.3 (11.8) |
| Mean minimum °F (°C) | 20.6 (−6.3) | 23.3 (−4.8) | 28.0 (−2.2) | 35.0 (1.7) | 45.1 (7.3) | 58.4 (14.7) | 64.1 (17.8) | 63.7 (17.6) | 55.0 (12.8) | 38.3 (3.5) | 27.9 (−2.3) | 24.0 (−4.4) | 18.9 (−7.3) |
| Record low °F (°C) | 3 (−16) | 14 (−10) | 18 (−8) | 24 (−4) | 35 (2) | 40 (4) | 56 (13) | 55 (13) | 37 (3) | 28 (−2) | 18 (−8) | 8 (−13) | 3 (−16) |
| Average precipitation inches (mm) | 4.62 (117) | 4.08 (104) | 4.10 (104) | 3.30 (84) | 3.86 (98) | 7.48 (190) | 6.46 (164) | 7.64 (194) | 5.32 (135) | 3.97 (101) | 2.21 (56) | 3.71 (94) | 56.75 (1,441) |
| Average precipitation days (≥ 0.01 in) | 5.7 | 6.1 | 6.6 | 5.0 | 6.2 | 10.8 | 9.8 | 10.4 | 7.2 | 5.1 | 3.7 | 5.7 | 82.3 |
Source 1: NOAA
Source 2: National Weather Service

== Demographics ==
Historical population
| Census | Pop. | Note | %± |
|---|---|---|---|
| 1930 | 352 | | — |
| 1940 | 561 | | 59.4% |
| 1950 | 739 | | 31.7% |
| 1960 | 952 | | 28.8% |
| 1970 | 974 | | 2.3% |
| 1980 | 951 | | −2.4% |
| 1990 | 1,049 | | 10.3% |
| 2000 | 930 | | −11.3% |
| 2010 | 1,053 | | 13.2% |
| 2020 | 1,013 | | −3.8% |
U.S. Decennial Census

=== 2020 census ===
As of the 2020 census, Nahunta had a population of 1,013. The median age was 39.3 years. 23.4% of residents were under the age of 18 and 19.4% of residents were 65 years of age or older. For every 100 females there were 75.0 males, and for every 100 females age 18 and over there were 68.7 males age 18 and over.

Nahunta racial composition as of 2020
| Race | Num. | Perc. |
|---|---|---|
| White (non-Hispanic) | 734 | 72.46% |
| Black or African American (non-Hispanic) | 208 | 20.53% |
| Native American | 3 | 0.3% |
| Asian | 3 | 0.3% |
| Other/mixed | 33 | 3.26% |
| Hispanic or Latino | 32 | 3.16% |

0.0% of residents lived in urban areas, while 100.0% lived in rural areas.

There were 412 households in Nahunta, of which 31.1% had children under the age of 18 living in them. Of all households, 32.5% were married-couple households, 15.5% were households with a male householder and no spouse or partner present, and 41.5% were households with a female householder and no spouse or partner present. About 31.8% of all households were made up of individuals and 17.0% had someone living alone who was 65 years of age or older. As of the 2020 census, 189 families resided in the city.

There were 497 housing units, of which 17.1% were vacant. The homeowner vacancy rate was 3.0% and the rental vacancy rate was 7.2%.

== Education ==
Brantley County students in grades kindergarten to grade twelve are in the Brantley County School District, which consists of five elementary schools, a middle school, and a high school. The district has 196 full-time teachers and over 3,332 students.

- Atkinson Elementary School
- Hoboken Elementary School
- Nahunta Elementary School
- Nahunta Primary School
- Waynesville Primary School
- Brantley County Middle School
- Brantley County High School

== See also ==
- Brantley County Courthouse
- Nahunta Subdivision
