= Brantley County, Georgia =

County in Georgia, United States

- County
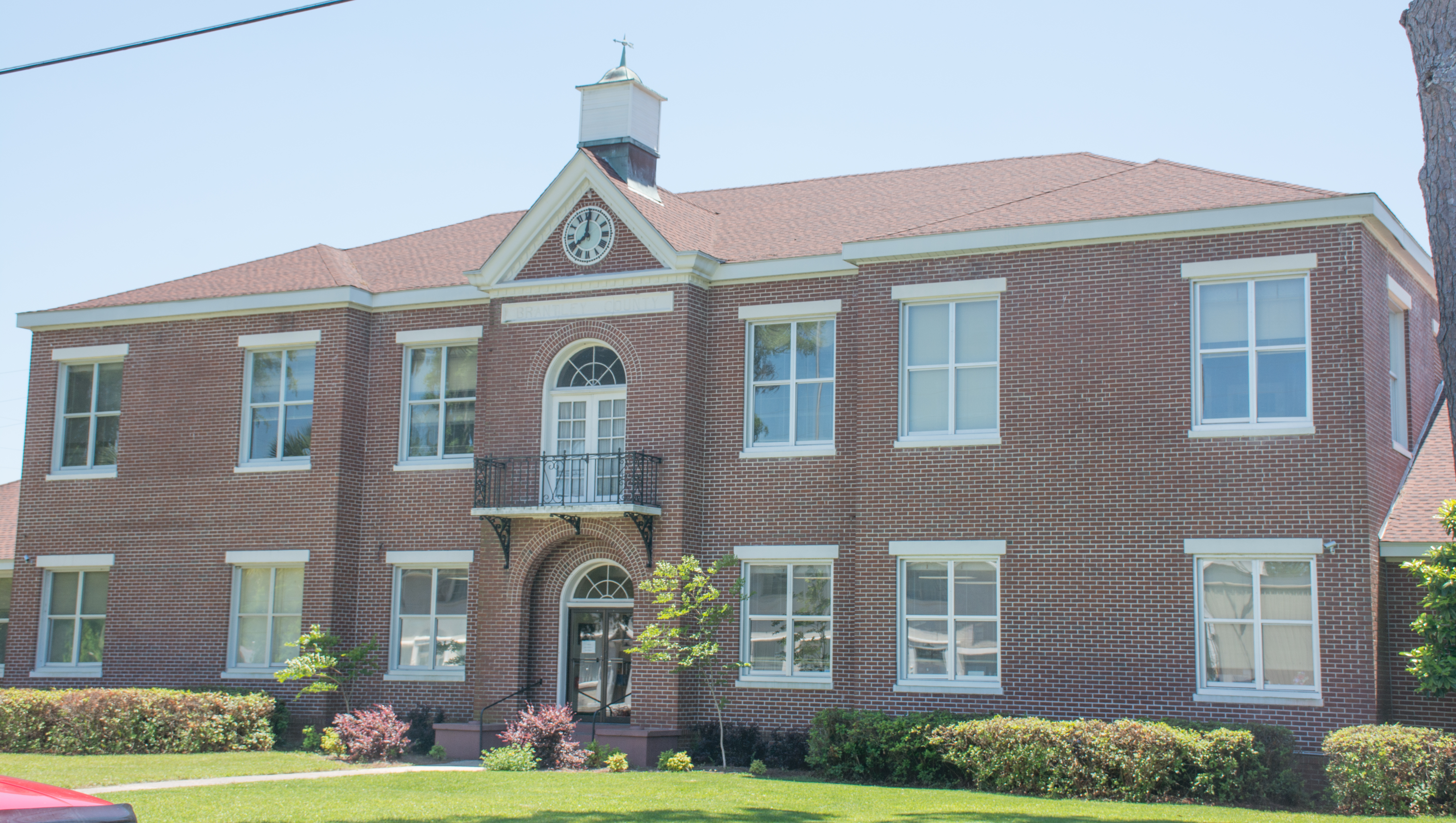
- Brantley County Courthouse in Nahunta

- Seal Logo

- Location within the U.S. state of Georgia
- Coordinates: 31°12′N 81°59′W
- Country: United States
- State: Georgia
- Founded: 1920; 106 years ago
- Named for: Benjamin Daniel Brantley or William Gordon Brantley
- Seat: Nahunta
- Largest city: Nahunta

Area
  - Total: 447 sq mi (1,160 km^{2})
  - Land: 442 sq mi (1,140 km^{2})
  - Water: 4.8 sq mi (12 km^{2}) 1.1%

Population (2020)
  - Total: 18,021
  - Estimate (2025): 18,936 ▲
  - Density: 42/sq mi (16/km^{2})
- Time zone: UTC−5 (Eastern)
  - Summer (DST): UTC−4 (EDT)
- Congressional district: 1st
- Website: brantleycounty-ga.gov

Brantley County is a county located in the southeastern part of the U.S. state of Georgia. As of the 2020 census, the population was 18,021. The county seat is Nahunta. Brantley County is part of the Brunswick, Georgia metropolitan area.

== History ==
Georgia voters passed a state constitutional amendment on November 2, 1920, to form Brantley County from pieces of three earlier surrounding Georgia counties: Charlton, Pierce, and Wayne counties. Although the precise origin of the county name is unknown, it is believed that it honors U.S. Representative (congressman) William Gordon Brantley or his father, Benjamin Daniel Brantley, a well-known local merchant and Confederate States Army soldier in the American Civil War (1861–1865).

== Geography ==
According to the U.S. Census Bureau, the county has a total area of 447 square miles (1,160 km^{2}), of which 442 square miles (1,140 km^{2}) is land and 4.8 square miles (12 km^{2}) (1.1%) is water. The Satilla River runs through Brantley County.

The bulk of Brantley County, from east of Hortense south to west of Waynesville and west to east of Waycross, is located in the Satilla River sub-basin of the St. Marys-Satilla basin. The county's eastern border area, east of Waynesville, is located in the Cumberland-St. Simons sub-basin of the St. Marys-Satilla River basin. A small northwestern corner, west of Hortense, is located in the Little Satilla sub-basin of the larger St. Marys-Satilla River basin, and a very small southwestern corner of Brantley County is located in the Upper Suwannee River sub-basin of the larger Suwannee River basin.

=== Major highways ===
- US 82 / SR 520
- US 301 / SR 23
- SR 15 / SR 121
- SR 32
- SR 110
- SR 95

=== Adjacent counties ===
- Wayne County - northeast
- Glynn County - east
- Camden County - southeast
- Charlton County - south
- Ware County - west
- Pierce County - northwest

=== Communities ===
==== Cities ====
- Hoboken
- Nahunta

==== Census-designated places ====
- Hickox
- Hortense
- Waynesville

==== Unincorporated communities ====
- Fort Mudge
- Schlatterville

== Demographics ==
Historical population
Census	Pop.	Note	%±
1930	6,895		—
1940	6,871		−0.3%
1950	6,387		−7.0%
1960	5,891		−7.8%
1970	5,940		0.8%
1980	8,701		46.5%
1990	11,077		27.3%
2000	14,629		32.1%
2010	18,411		25.9%
2020	18,021		−2.1%
2025 (est.)	18,936	▲	5.1%
U.S. Decennial Census; 1790-1880 1890-1910; 1920-1930 1930-1940; 1940-1950 1960-1980; 1980-2000 2010

=== Racial and ethnic composition ===
Brantley County, Georgia – Racial and ethnic composition Note: the US Census treats Hispanic/Latino as an ethnic category. This table excludes Latinos from the racial categories and assigns them to a separate category. Hispanics/Latinos may be of any race.
Race / Ethnicity (NH = Non-Hispanic)	Pop 1980	Pop 1990	Pop 2000	Pop 2010	Pop 2020	% 1980	% 1990	% 2000	% 2010	% 2020
White alone (NH)	8,068	10,408	13,712	17,198	16,317	92.72%	93.96%	93.73%	93.41%	90.54%
Black or African American alone (NH)	555	596	579	531	562	6.38%	5.38%	3.96%	2.88%	3.12%
Native American or Alaska Native alone (NH)	11	32	20	56	45	0.13%	0.29%	0.14%	0.30%	0.25%
Asian alone (NH)	4	5	13	37	42	0.05%	0.05%	0.09%	0.20%	0.23%
Native Hawaiian or Pacific Islander alone (NH)	x	x	1	2	3	x	x	0.01%	0.01%	0.02%
Other race alone (NH)	8	0	3	10	34	0.09%	0.00%	0.02%	0.05%	0.19%
Mixed race or Multiracial (NH)	x	x	149	234	692	x	x	1.02%	1.27%	3.84%
Hispanic or Latino (any race)	55	36	152	343	326	0.63%	0.32%	1.04%	1.86%	1.81%
Total	8,701	11,077	14,629	18,411	18,021	100.00%	100.00%	100.00%	100.00%	100.00%

=== 2020 census ===
As of the 2020 census, the county had a population of 18,021. Of the residents, 24.0% were under the age of 18 and 16.6% were 65 years of age or older; the median age was 40.3 years. For every 100 females there were 97.6 males, and for every 100 females age 18 and over there were 95.1 males. 0.7% of residents lived in urban areas and 99.3% lived in rural areas.

There were 6,915 households and 4,578 families residing in the county; 32.4% of the households had children under the age of 18 living with them and 24.8% had a female householder with no spouse or partner present. About 24.4% of all households were made up of individuals and 10.9% had someone living alone who was 65 years of age or older.

There were 8,143 housing units, of which 15.1% were vacant. Among occupied housing units, 78.9% were owner-occupied and 21.1% were renter-occupied. The homeowner vacancy rate was 1.2% and the rental vacancy rate was 7.9%.

== Politics ==
United States presidential election results for Brantley County, Georgia
Year	Republican		Democratic		Third party(ies)	
Year	No.	%	No.	%	No.	%
1924	9	3.23%	238	85.30%	32	11.47%
1928	172	50.89%	166	49.11%	0	0.00%
1932	22	3.07%	693	96.65%	2	0.28%
1936	40	6.99%	527	92.13%	5	0.87%
1940	67	6.50%	960	93.20%	3	0.29%
1944	124	18.67%	540	81.33%	0	0.00%
1948	79	10.31%	463	60.44%	224	29.24%
1952	276	20.32%	1,082	79.68%	0	0.00%
1956	228	15.88%	1,208	84.12%	0	0.00%
1960	344	20.51%	1,333	79.49%	0	0.00%
1964	1,231	57.52%	909	42.48%	0	0.00%
1968	237	10.47%	317	14.01%	1,709	75.52%
1972	1,587	82.44%	338	17.56%	0	0.00%
1976	358	13.50%	2,294	86.50%	0	0.00%
1980	882	29.63%	2,066	69.40%	29	0.97%
1984	1,679	52.53%	1,517	47.47%	0	0.00%
1988	1,539	51.18%	1,450	48.22%	18	0.60%
1992	1,541	36.06%	1,883	44.06%	850	19.89%
1996	1,738	47.83%	1,494	41.11%	402	11.06%
2000	3,118	68.29%	1,372	30.05%	76	1.66%
2004	4,333	77.02%	1,258	22.36%	35	0.62%
2008	5,080	80.79%	1,119	17.80%	89	1.42%
2012	4,964	82.46%	939	15.60%	117	1.94%
2016	5,567	88.35%	619	9.82%	115	1.83%
2020	6,993	90.24%	700	9.03%	56	0.72%
2024	7,744	91.11%	736	8.66%	20	0.24%

United States Senate election results for Brantley County, Georgia2
Year	Republican		Democratic		Third party(ies)	
Year	No.	%	No.	%	No.	%
2020	6,812	89.44%	688	9.03%	116	1.52%
2020	6,003	90.71%	615	9.29%	0	0.00%

United States Senate election results for Brantley County, Georgia3
Year	Republican		Democratic		Third party(ies)	
Year	No.	%	No.	%	No.	%
2020	3,128	42.34%	236	3.19%	4,024	54.47%
2020	5,999	90.73%	613	9.27%	0	0.00%
2022	5,275	90.23%	477	8.16%	94	1.61%
2022	5,039	91.52%	467	8.48%	0	0.00%

Georgia Gubernatorial election results for Brantley County
Year	Republican		Democratic		Third party(ies)	
Year	No.	%	No.	%	No.	%
2022	5,416	92.44%	393	6.71%	50	0.85%

As of the 2020s, Brantley County is a Republican stronghold, voting 91% for Donald Trump in 2024. The last Democrat to carry the county was Bill Clinton in 1992, and it has swung hard to the right in the following elections. In 2020, Donald Trump carried the county with 90.2% of the vote, the most out of any county in Georgia.

For elections to the United States House of Representatives, Brantley County is part of Georgia's 1st congressional district, currently represented by Buddy Carter. For elections to the Georgia State Senate, Brantley County is part of District 3. For elections to the Georgia House of Representatives, Brantley County is part of District 174.

== See also ==
- National Register of Historic Places listings in Brantley County, Georgia
- List of counties in Georgia
