= 2019–20 South Carolina Gamecocks men's basketball team =

American college basketball season

2019–20 South Carolina Gamecocks men's basketball
- Conference: Southeastern Conference
- Record: 18–13 (10–8 SEC)
- Head coach: Frank Martin (8th season)
- Assistant coaches: Perry Clark; Chuck Martin; Bruce Shingler
- Home arena: Colonial Life Arena

2019–20 Southeastern Conference men's basketball standings
	Conf.				Overall
Team	W		L	PCT	W		L	PCT
No. 8 Kentucky	15	–	3	.833	25	–	6	.806
No. 20 Auburn	12	–	6	.667	25	–	6	.806
LSU	12	–	6	.667	21	–	10	.677
Mississippi State	11	–	7	.611	20	–	11	.645
Florida	11	–	7	.611	19	–	12	.613
South Carolina	10	–	8	.556	18	–	13	.581
Texas A&M	10	–	8	.556	16	–	14	.533
Tennessee	9	–	9	.500	17	–	14	.548
Alabama	8	–	10	.444	16	–	15	.516
Arkansas	7	–	11	.389	20	–	12	.625
Missouri	7	–	11	.389	15	–	16	.484
Ole Miss	6	–	12	.333	15	–	17	.469
Georgia	5	–	13	.278	16	–	16	.500
Vanderbilt	3	–	15	.167	11	–	21	.344
Note: The 2020 SEC tournament was canceled after the first round due to the COVID-19 pandemic. Rankings from AP poll

The 2019–20 South Carolina Gamecocks men's basketball team represented the University of South Carolina during the 2019–20 NCAA Division I men's basketball season. The team's head coach, Frank Martin, was in his eighth season at South Carolina. The team played its home games at Colonial Life Arena in Columbia, South Carolina as a member of the Southeastern Conference. They finished the season 18–13, 10–8 in SEC play to finish in a tie for sixth place. They were set to take on Arkansas in the second round of the SEC tournament. However, the remainder of the SEC Tournament and all other postseason tournaments were cancelled amid the COVID-19 pandemic.

== Previous season ==
The Gamecocks finished the 2018–19 season finished the season 16–16, 11–7 in SEC play to finish in a tie for 4th place. As a No. 4 seed in the SEC tournament, they lost in the quarterfinals to Ole Miss.

== Offseason ==
=== Departures ===
Name	Number	Pos.	Height	Weight	Year	Hometown	Reason for departure
Hassani Gravett	2	G	6'1"	188	RS Senior	Villa Rica, GA	Graduated
Tre Campbell	4	G	6'2"	183	GS Senior	Washington, D.C.	Graduated
Felipe Haase	13	F	6'9"	253	Sophomore	Osorno, Chile	Transferred to Mercer
Evan Hinston	23	G	6'4"	240	Junior	Deltona, FL	Left the team for personal reasons
Chris Silva	30	F	6'9"	234	Senior	Libreville, Gabon	Graduated/Undrafted in 2019 NBA draft
Jason Cudd	33	F	7'1"	263	Sophomore	Myrtle Beach, SC	Transferred

=== Incoming transfers ===
Name	Number	Pos.	Height	Weight	Year	Hometown	Previous School
Micaiah Henry	13	C	6'9"	235	RS Senior	Decatur, GA	Tennessee Tech
Seventh Woods	25	G	6'2"	185	Senior	Columbia, SC	North Carolina

=== 2019 recruiting class ===
College recruiting
Name	Hometown	School	Height	Weight	Commit date
Wildens Leveque; C	Brockton, MA	Gould Academy	6 ft 9 in (2.06 m)	210 lb (95 kg)	Oct 12, 2018
Wildens Leveque; C	Recruit ratings: Scout: Rivals: 247Sports: ESPN:				
Trey Anderson; SF	San Diego, CA	Mater Dei Catholic High School	6 ft 4 in (1.93 m)	180 lb (82 kg)	Nov 21, 2018
Trey Anderson; SF	Recruit ratings: Scout: Rivals: 247Sports: ESPN:				
Jalyn McCreary; SF	Kennesaw, GA	Legacy Early College High School	6 ft 7 in (2.01 m)	185 lb (84 kg)	Oct 12, 2018
Jalyn McCreary; SF	Recruit ratings: Scout: Rivals: 247Sports: ESPN:				
Trae Hannibal; SG	Hartsville, SC	Hartsville High School	6 ft 2 in (1.88 m)	204 lb (93 kg)	Jun 1, 2018
Trae Hannibal; SG	Recruit ratings: Scout: Rivals: 247Sports: ESPN:				
Overall recruit ranking:
Note: In many cases, Scout, Rivals, 247Sports, On3, and ESPN may conflict in their listings of height and weight.; In these cases, the average was taken. ESPN grades are on a 100-point scale.; Sources: "South Carolina 2019 Basketball Commitments". Rivals.; "2019 Team Ranking". Rivals.

=== 2020 recruiting class ===
College recruiting (2020)
Name	Hometown	School	Height	Weight	Commit date
Patrick Iriel; C	Columbia, SC	A. C. Flora High School	6 ft 10 in (2.08 m)	235 lb (107 kg)	Aug 6, 2019
Patrick Iriel; C	Recruit ratings: Scout: Rivals: 247Sports: ESPN:				
Overall recruit ranking:
Note: In many cases, Scout, Rivals, 247Sports, On3, and ESPN may conflict in their listings of height and weight.; In these cases, the average was taken. ESPN grades are on a 100-point scale.; Sources: "South Carolina 2020 Basketball Commitments". Rivals.; "2020 Team Ranking". Rivals.

== Preseason ==
=== SEC media poll ===
The SEC media poll was released on October 15, 2019.

Media poll
Predicted finish	Team
1	Kentucky
2	Florida
3	LSU
4	Auburn
5	Tennessee
6	Alabama
7	Mississippi State
8	Ole Miss
9	Georgia
10	South Carolina
11	Arkansas
12	Texas A&M
13	Missouri
14	Vanderbilt

== Roster ==
2019–20 South Carolina Gamecocks men's basketball team
Players
Coaches

Pos.	#	Name	Height	Weight	Year	Previous school	Hometown
G	00	A. J. Lawson	6 ft 6 in (1.98 m)	178 lb (81 kg)	So	GTA Prep	Mississauga, ON
G	1	T. J. Moss	6 ft 4 in (1.93 m)	195 lb (88 kg)	So	Findlay Prep	Memphis, TN
F	2	Trey Anderson	6 ft 5 in (1.96 m)	203 lb (92 kg)	Fr	Mater Dei Catholic	San Diego, CA
F	4	Jalyn McCreary	6 ft 7 in (2.01 m)	225 lb (102 kg)	Fr	Legacy Early College	Marietta, GA
G	5	Jermaine Couisnard	6 ft 4 in (1.93 m)	211 lb (96 kg)	RS Fr	Montverde Academy	East Chicago, IN
F	10	Justin Minaya	6 ft 5 in (1.96 m)	215 lb (98 kg)	RS So	Northern Valley Regional HS	Old Tappan, NJ
G	12	Trae Hannibal	6 ft 1 in (1.85 m)	217 lb (98 kg)	Fr	Hartsville	Hartsville, SC
F/C	13	Micaiah Henry	6 ft 9 in (2.06 m)	235 lb (107 kg)	RS Sr	Columbia; Tennessee Tech	Decatur, GA
F	14	Nathan Nelson (W)	6 ft 5 in (1.96 m)	189 lb (86 kg)	So	Blackman HS	Murfreesboro, TN
F	20	Alanzo Frink	6 ft 8 in (2.03 m)	260 lb (118 kg)	So	Roselle Catholic HS	Jersey City, NJ
F	21	Maik Kotsar	6 ft 11 in (2.11 m)	270 lb (122 kg)	Sr	Sunrise Christian Academy	Tallinn, Estonia
G	23	Mike Green (W)	6 ft 1 in (1.85 m)	188 lb (85 kg)	Fr	Christian Academy of Myrtle Beach	Myrtle Beach, SC
F	24	Keyshawn Bryant	6 ft 6 in (1.98 m)	190 lb (86 kg)	So	Winter Haven HS	Winter Haven, FL
G	25	Seventh Woods (redshirt)	6 ft 1 in (1.85 m)	189 lb (86 kg)	Sr	Hammond School; North Carolina	Columbia, SC
G	52	Jair Bolden	6 ft 3 in (1.91 m)	215 lb (98 kg)	RS Jr	Westtown School; George Washington	Brooklyn, NY

Head coach

- Frank Martin (FIU)

Assistant coach(es)

- Perry Clark (Gettysburg)
- Bruce Shingler (St. Augustine's)
- Chuck Martin (Monmouth)

Legend

- (C) Team captain
- (S) Suspended
- (I) Ineligible
- (W) Walk-on
- Injured
- Current redshirt

Roster

== Schedule and results ==
Date time, TV	Rank^{#}	Opponent^{#}	Result	Record	High points	High rebounds	High assists	Site (attendance) city, state
Exhibition
October 30, 2019*; 7:00 pm		Columbia International	W 87–50	–	23 – Lawson	8 – Frink	7 – Lawson	Colonial Life Arena; Columbia, SC
Non-conference regular season
November 6, 2019*; 7:00 pm, SECN+		North Alabama	W 77–55	1–0	17 – Minaya	11 – Minaya	4 – Lawson	Colonial Life Arena (11,927); Columbia, SC
November 10, 2019*; 12:00 pm, SECN		Wyoming	W 66–32	2–0	12 – Tied	7 – Frink	3 – Minaya	Colonial Life Arena (10,255); Columbia, SC
November 15, 2019*; 7:00 pm, SECN+		Cleveland State	W 90–63	3–0	28 – Lawson	12 – Kotsar	4 – Tied	Colonial Life Arena (10,083); Columbia, SC
November 19, 2019*; 7:00 pm, SECN+		Boston University; Cancún Challenge campus site game	L 70–78	3–1	22 – Lawson	7 – Tied	5 – Lawson	Colonial Life Arena (10,113); Columbia, SC
November 22, 2019*; 7:00 pm, SECN+		Gardner–Webb; Cancún Challenge campus site game	W 74–69	4–1	16 – Tied	6 – Kotsar	6 – Couisnard	Colonial Life Arena (10,022); Columbia, SC
November 26, 2019*; 6:00 pm, CBSSN		vs. Wichita State; Cancún Challenge semifinals	L 47–70	4–2	12 – Kotsar	8 – Leveque	3 – Kotsar	Hard Rock Hotel Riviera (1,311); Cancún, Mexico
November 27, 2019*; 6:00 pm, CBSSN		vs. Northern Iowa; Cancún Challenge	L 72–78	4–3	20 – Lawson	5 – Tied	3 – Tied	Hard Rock Hotel Riviera; Cancún, Mexico
December 1, 2019*; 2:00 pm, SECN+		George Washington	W 74–65	5–3	17 – Kotsar	9 – Kotsar	4 – Tied	Colonial Life Arena (9,843); Columbia, SC
December 4, 2019*; 7:00 pm, CBSSN		at UMass	W 84–80	6–3	24 – Lawson	9 – Kotsar	6 – Couisnard	Mullins Center (3,043); Amherst, MA
December 8, 2019*; 12:00 pm, ESPNU		Houston; American/SEC Alliance	L 56–76	6–4	12 – Kotsar	6 – Minaya	4 – Minaya	Colonial Life Arena (11,164); Columbia, SC
December 15, 2019*; 5:00 pm, ESPN2		at Clemson; Rivalry	W 67–54	7–4	20 – Lawson	7 – Kotsar	3 – Tied	Littlejohn Coliseum (6,394); Clemson, SC
December 22, 2019*; 3:00 pm, ABC		at No. 9 Virginia	W 70–59	8–4	22 – Bolden	4 – Tied	4 – Minaya	John Paul Jones Arena (14,409); Charlottesville, VA
December 30, 2019*; 3:00 pm, SECN+		Stetson	L 56–63	8–5	11 – Kotsar	9 – Minaya	4 – Couisnard	Colonial Life Arena (10,985); Columbia, SC
SEC regular season
January 7, 2020; 7:00 pm, ESPNU		Florida	L 68–81	8–6 (0–1)	18 – Kotsar	10 – Kotsar	3 – Tied	Colonial Life Arena (10,651); Columbia, SC
January 11, 2020; 1:00 pm, SECN		at Tennessee	L 55–56	8–7 (0–2)	17 – Kotsar	10 – Minaya	2 – Tied	Thompson–Boling Arena (19,603); Knoxville, TN
January 15, 2020; 6:30 pm, SECN		No. 10 Kentucky	W 81–78	9–7 (1–2)	26 – Couisnard	6 – Minaya	3 – Tied	Colonial Life Arena (18,000); Columbia, SC
January 18, 2020; 1:00 pm, SECN		at Texas A&M	W 81–67	10–7 (2–2)	19 – Bolden	10 – Kotsar	7 – Kotsar	Reed Arena (7,466); College Station, TX
January 22, 2020; 7:00 pm, ESPNU		at No. 16 Auburn	L 67–80	10–8 (2–3)	16 – Couisnard	8 – Kotsar	5 – Kotsar	Auburn Arena (8,430); Auburn, AL
January 25, 2020; 8:00 pm, SECN		Vanderbilt	W 90–64	11–8 (3–3)	14 – Tied	12 – Minaya	5 – Hannibal	Colonial Life Arena (12,393); Columbia, SC
January 29, 2020; 8:30 pm, SECN		at Arkansas	W 79–77	12–8 (4–3)	19 – Lawson	9 – Kotsar	4 – Couisnard	Bud Walton Arena (14,085); Fayetteville, AR
February 1, 2020; 3:30 pm, SECN		Missouri	W 76–54	13–8 (5–3)	21 – Kotsar	11 – Kotsar	6 – Couisnard	Colonial Life Arena (14,678); Columbia, SC
February 5, 2020; 7:00 pm, SECN		at Ole Miss	L 70–84	13–9 (5–4)	28 – Couisnard	8 – Kotsar	5 – Moss	The Pavilion at Ole Miss (6,990); Oxford, MS
February 8, 2020; 1:00 pm, SECN		Texas A&M	W 74–54	14–9 (6–4)	19 – Couisnard	5 – Tied	4 – Kotsar	Colonial Life Arena (13,388); Columbia, SC
February 12, 2020; 6:30 pm, SECN		at Georgia	W 75–59	15–9 (7–4)	20 – Lawson	9 – Frink	4 – Couisnard	Stegeman Coliseum (8,857); Athens, GA
February 15, 2020; 6:00 pm, SECN		Tennessee	W 63–61	16–9 (8–4)	13 – Kotsar	8 – Kotsar	2 – Tied	Colonial Life Arena (15,085); Columbia, SC
February 19, 2020; 9:00 pm, SECN		at Mississippi State	L 76–79	16–10 (8–5)	24 – Kotsar	7 – Tied	4 – Kotsar	Humphrey Coliseum (6,281); Starkville, MS
February 22, 2020; 6:00 pm, ESPN2		LSU	L 80–86	16–11 (8–6)	15 – Tied	10 – Bryant	4 – Coulsnard	Colonial Life Arena (15,979); Columbia, SC
February 26, 2020; 6:30 pm, SECN		Georgia	W 94–90 ^{OT}	17–11 (9–6)	22 – Frink	10 – Tied	4 – 4 tied	Colonial Life Arena (11,613); Columbia, SC
February 29, 2020; 8:30 pm, SECN		at Alabama	L 86–90	17–12 (9–7)	22 – Bryant	13 – Bryant	5 – Couisnard	Coleman Coliseum (11,112); Tuscaloosa, AL
March 3, 2020; 6:30 pm, SECN		Mississippi State	W 83–71	18–12 (10–7)	20 – Kotsar	7 – Bryant	10 – Couisnard	Colonial Life Arena (10,889); Columbia, SC
March 7, 2020; 12:30 pm, SECN		at Vanderbilt	L 74–83	18–13 (10–8)	13 – Tied	7 – Bryant	4 – Kotsar	Memorial Gymnasium (10,852); Nashville, TN
SEC tournament
March 12, 2020; 9:30 pm, SECN	(6)	vs. (11) Arkansas; Second round	Cancelled due to the COVID-19 pandemic					Bridgestone Arena; Nashville, TN
*Non-conference game. ^{#}Rankings from AP Poll. (#) Tournament seedings in parentheses. All times are in Eastern Time.
