= Saben Lee =

American basketball player (born 1999)

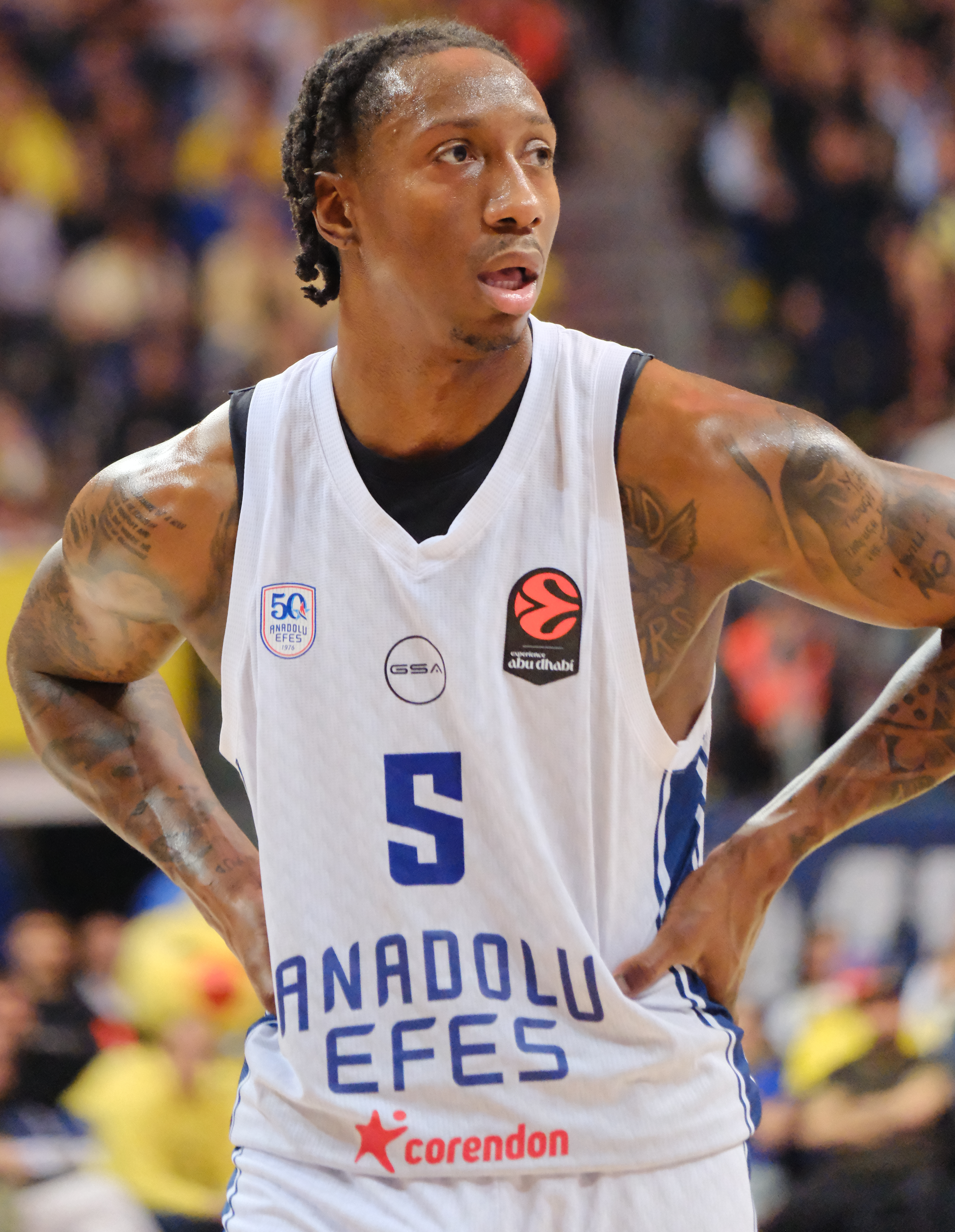
- Lee with Anadolu Efes in 2026

No. 7 – Žalgiris Kaunas
- Position: Point guard / shooting guard
- League: LKL; EuroLeague

Personal information
- Born: June 23, 1999 (age 27) St. Louis, Missouri, U.S.
- Listed height: 6 ft 2 in (1.88 m)
- Listed weight: 183 lb (83 kg)

Career information
- High school: Corona del Sol (Tempe, Arizona)
- College: Vanderbilt (2017–2020)
- NBA draft: 2020: 2nd round, 38th overall pick
- Drafted by: Utah Jazz
- Playing career: 2020–present

Career history
- 2020–2022: Detroit Pistons
- 2021–2022: →Motor City Cruise
- 2022: Raptors 905
- 2022: Philadelphia 76ers
- 2022: →Delaware Blue Coats
- 2022–2023: Raptors 905
- 2022–2024: Phoenix Suns
- 2024: Manisa
- 2024: Maccabi Tel Aviv
- 2024–2025: Manisa
- 2025: Olympiacos
- 2025–2026: Anadolu Efes
- 2026–present: Žalgiris Kaunas

Career highlights
- Greek League champion (2025); Greek Supercup winner (2025); All-NBA G League Second Team (2022); Second-team All-SEC (2020)
- Stats at NBA.com
- Stats at Basketball Reference

Saben Anthonia Lee (/ˈseɪbən/ SAY-bən; born June 23, 1999) is an American professional basketball player for Žalgiris Kaunas of the Lithuanian Basketball League (LKL) and the EuroLeague. He played college basketball for the Vanderbilt Commodores.

== Early life ==
Lee grew up in Phoenix, Arizona and attended Corona del Sol High School in Tempe, Arizona. As a junior, Lee was named first-team All-State after averaging 18 points, five rebounds, and three assists per game. Lee committed to play college basketball at Vanderbilt after his junior year over offers from Louisville, Stanford, Florida State, and Nebraska. He was again named first team All-State as a senior and scored 39 points against Cesar Chavez High School in the state semifinal to lead the Aztecs to the state title game before falling to Basha High School.

== College career ==
Lee served as the Commodores starting point guard as a true freshman and averaged 10.6 points, 3.1 assists and a team-leading 1.2 steals per game. As a sophomore, Lee averaged 12.7 points, 3.3 rebounds, 3.8 assists and 1.0 steals per game. As a junior, he averaged 18.6 points, 3.5 rebounds, 4.2 assists and 1.5 steals per game and was named second team All-SEC by the Associated Press. He scored a career high 38 points on March 3, 2020, in an 87–79 win over Alabama. Following the end of the season, Lee declared for the 2020 NBA draft. On May 1, he announced he was signing with an agent and forgoing his last season of eligibility.

== Professional career ==
=== Detroit Pistons (2020–2022) ===
Lee was selected 38th overall by the Utah Jazz in the 2020 NBA draft, then subsequently traded to the Detroit Pistons on November 22, 2020. On December 1, 2020, the Detroit Pistons signed him to a two-way contract with their NBA G League affiliate, the Motor City Cruise. On May 11, 2021, Lee scored a career-high 22 points in a 119–100 loss to the Minnesota Timberwolves. On August 6, 2021, the Pistons re-signed Lee to a multi-year contract. On April 1, 2022, Lee achieved his first career double-double, with 11 points and 12 assists in a 110–101 win against the Oklahoma City Thunder.

=== Raptors 905 (2022) ===
On September 26, 2022, Lee was traded with Kelly Olynyk to the Utah Jazz for Bojan Bogdanović. He was waived by the Jazz on October 9. On October 11, Lee signed an exhibit 10 contract with the Phoenix Suns. He was waived on October 13. On October 16, Lee signed an exhibit 10 contract with the Toronto Raptors, but was waived the same day. On October 18, Lee joined the Raptors 905 of the NBA G League.

=== Philadelphia 76ers (2022) ===
On November 23, 2022, Lee signed with the Philadelphia 76ers, replacing Michael Foster Jr. on a two-way contract. On December 26, he was waived in favor of Louis King.

=== Return to the 905 (2022–2023) ===
On December 28, 2022, Lee was re-acquired by the Raptors 905.

=== Phoenix Suns (2023–2024) ===
On January 11, 2023, Lee signed a 10-day contract with the Phoenix Suns. He signed a second 10-day contract with the Suns on January 21. Lee signed a two-way contract with the Suns on February 1. He was named to the G League's inaugural Next Up Game for the 2022–23 season. During the final game of the regular season, Lee recorded his second double-double of his NBA career (first with the Suns) with a career-high 25 points and 10 rebounds in a 119–114 loss to the Los Angeles Clippers on April 9, 2023.

On July 13, 2023, Lee signed another two-way contract with the Suns.

=== Manisa Basket (2024) ===
On August 30, 2024, Lee signed with Manisa Basket of the Basketbol Süper Ligi. He would only play in one game for Manisa Basket before leaving the team.

=== Maccabi Tel Aviv (2024) ===
On October 13, 2024, Lee signed with Maccabi Tel Aviv of the Israeli Basketball Premier League. He signed a two-year contract.

=== Return to Manisa Basket (2024–2025) ===
On November 23, 2024, Lee returned to Manisa Basket after struggling to settle in Maccabi.

=== Olympiacos (2025) ===
On February 27, 2025, Lee signed with Olympiacos of the Greek Basketball League (GBL). He signed until the end of the 2026–27 season.

=== Anadolu Efes (2025–2026) ===
On December 29, 2025, Lee signed a remainder of the season contract with Anadolu Efes of the Basketbol Süper Ligi (BSL) and the EuroLeague. On June 9, 2026, Anadolu Efes announced that it had parted ways with Lee following the conclusion of the 2025–26 season.

=== Žalgiris Kaunas (2026–present) ===
On June 16, 2026, Lee signed a two–year contract with Zalgiris Kaunas of the Lithuanian Basketball League.

== Career statistics ==
Legend
GP	Games played	GS	Games started	MPG	Minutes per game
FG%	Field goal percentage	3P%	3-point field goal percentage	FT%	Free throw percentage
RPG	Rebounds per game	APG	Assists per game	SPG	Steals per game
BPG	Blocks per game	PPG	Points per game	**Bold**	Career high

=== Regular season ===
Year	Team	GP	GS	MPG	FG%	3P%	FT%	RPG	APG	SPG	BPG	PPG
2020–21	Detroit	**48**	**7**	**16.3**	.471	.348	.685	2.0	**3.6**	.7	**.3**	5.6
2021–22	Detroit	37	0	**16.3**	.390	.233	**.789**	**2.4**	2.9	**1.0**	**.3**	5.6
2022–23	Philadelphia	2	0	5.1	**.750**	.000	—	.0	1.0	.5	.0	3.0
2022–23	Phoenix	23	1	15.8	.393	**.379**	.737	2.0	2.8	.8	.0	**6.3**
2023–24	Phoenix	24	0	7.7	.364	.125	.744	1.3	1.3	.3	.1	3.0
Career		134	8	14.5	.421	.271	.734	1.9	2.8	.7	.2	5.2

=== College ===
Year	Team	GP	GS	MPG	FG%	3P%	FT%	RPG	APG	SPG	BPG	PPG
2017–18	Vanderbilt	**32**	29	26.8	.462	.307	.726	3.0	3.1	1.2	.2	10.6
2018–19	Vanderbilt	**32**	**32**	32.6	.460	**.362**	.675	3.3	3.8	1.0	.2	12.7
2019–20	Vanderbilt	**32**	17	**32.9**	**.483**	.322	**.752**	**3.5**	**4.2**	**1.5**	**.3**	**18.6**
Career		96	78	30.7	.471	.328	.718	3.3	3.7	1.3	.2	13.9

== Personal life ==
Lee is the son of former NFL running back Amp Lee and Vanderbilt University Law Graduate, Natalie Williams. He is a cousin of basketball player Trent Forrest.
