= 2019–20 Southeastern Conference men's basketball season =

- League: NCAA Division I
- Sport: Basketball
- Teams: 14
- TV partner(s): CBS, ESPN, SEC Network

Regular Season
- 2020 SEC Champions: Kentucky
- Season MVP: Mason Jones (co-AP); Reggie Perry (co-AP); Immanuel Quickley (Coaches)

Tournament
- Venue: Bridgestone Arena, Nashville, Tennessee

Basketball seasons
- ← 2018–19 2020–21 →

2019–20 Southeastern Conference men's basketball standings
	Conf.				Overall
Team	W		L	PCT	W		L	PCT
No. 8 Kentucky	15	–	3	.833	25	–	6	.806
No. 20 Auburn	12	–	6	.667	25	–	6	.806
LSU	12	–	6	.667	21	–	10	.677
Mississippi State	11	–	7	.611	20	–	11	.645
Florida	11	–	7	.611	19	–	12	.613
South Carolina	10	–	8	.556	18	–	13	.581
Texas A&M	10	–	8	.556	16	–	14	.533
Tennessee	9	–	9	.500	17	–	14	.548
Alabama	8	–	10	.444	16	–	15	.516
Arkansas	7	–	11	.389	20	–	12	.625
Missouri	7	–	11	.389	15	–	16	.484
Ole Miss	6	–	12	.333	15	–	17	.469
Georgia	5	–	13	.278	16	–	16	.500
Vanderbilt	3	–	15	.167	11	–	21	.344
Note: The 2020 SEC tournament was canceled after the first round due to the COVID-19 pandemic. Rankings from AP poll

The 2019–20 Southeastern Conference men's basketball season began with practices in October 2019, followed by the start of the 2019–20 NCAA Division I men's basketball season in November. Conference play started in early January 2020 and was scheduled to end in March, after which 14 member teams were to participate in the 2020 SEC men's basketball tournament at Bridgestone Arena in Nashville, Tennessee. The tournament champion was to have been guaranteed a selection to the 2020 NCAA Division I men's basketball tournament, but the tournament was canceled due to the COVID-19 pandemic in the United States.

== Preseason ==
Kentucky was predicted to win the 2020 SEC championship in voting by a select panel of both SEC and national media members. Florida's Kerry Blackshear was the choice of the media for SEC Men's Basketball Player of the Year. Blackshear, Edwards, Hagans, Tyree and Perry were each All-SEC First Team selections.

=== Media Day Selections ===
	Media
1.	Kentucky
2.	Florida
3.	LSU
4.	Auburn
5.	Tennessee
6.	Alabama
7.	Mississippi State
8.	Ole Miss
9.	Georgia
10.	South Carolina
11.	Arkansas
12.	Texas A&M
13.	Missouri
14.	Vanderbilt

() first place votes

=== Preseason All-SEC teams ===
Media
**Kerry Blackshear Jr. Florida**
Anthony Edwards Georgia
Ashton Hagans Kentucky
Breein Tyree Ole Miss
Reggie Perry Mississippi State

- Players in bold are media choices for SEC Player of the Year

== Head coaches ==
Note: Stats shown are before the beginning of the season. Overall and SEC records are from time at current school.

Team	Head coach	Previous job	Season at school	Overall record	SEC record	NCAA Tournaments	NCAA Final Fours	NCAA Championships
Alabama	Nate Oats	Buffalo	1	0–0 (–)	0–0 (–)	0	0	0
Arkansas	Eric Musselman	Nevada	1	0–0 (–)	0–0 (–)	0	0	0
Auburn	Bruce Pearl	Tennessee	6	100–72 (.581)	40–50 (.444)	2	1	0
Florida	Mike White	Louisiana Tech	5	89–53 (.627)	43–29 (.597)	3	0	0
Georgia	Tom Crean	Indiana	2	11–21 (.344)	2–16 (.111)	0	0	0
Kentucky	John Calipari	Memphis	11	305–71 (.811)	136–38 (.782)	9	4	1
LSU	Will Wade	VCU	3	43–20 (.683)	23–12 (.657)	1	0	0
Mississippi State	Ben Howland	UCLA	5	78–56 (.582)	32–40 (.444)	1	0	0
Missouri	Cuonzo Martin	California	3	35–30 (.538)	15–21 (.417)	1	0	0
Ole Miss	Kermit Davis	Middle Tennessee	2	20–13 (.606)	10–8 (.556)	1	0	0
South Carolina	Frank Martin	Kansas State	8	129–106 (.549)	56–70 (.444)	1	1	0
Tennessee	Rick Barnes	Texas	5	88–50 (.638)	42–30 (.583)	2	0	0
Texas A&M	Buzz Williams	Virginia Tech	1	0–0 (–)	0–0 (–)	0	0	0
Vanderbilt	Jerry Stackhouse	Memphis Grizzlies (asst.)	1	0–0 (–)	0–0 (–)	0	0	0

== Rankings ==
Legend
Increase in ranking
Decrease in ranking
Not ranked previous week

		Pre	Wk 2	Wk 3	Wk 4	Wk 5	Wk 6	Wk 7	Wk 8	Wk 9	Wk 10	Wk 11	Wk 12	Wk 13	Wk 14	Wk 15	Wk 16	Wk 17	Wk 18	Wk 19	Final
Alabama	AP	RV																			
Alabama	C																				
Arkansas	AP		RV	RV	RV	RV		RV		RV	RV	RV	RV								
Arkansas	C			RV	RV	RV	RV	RV	RV	RV	RV	RV	RV								
Auburn	AP	24	22	19	18	14	12	12	8	8	5	4	16								
Auburn	C	23	23	18	17	13	10	9	8	7	5	4	16								
Florida	AP	6	15	RV	24	RV	RV	RV		RV			RV								
Florida	C	6	6	RV	25	RV	RV			RV	RV		RV								
Georgia	AP																				
Georgia	C																				
Kentucky	AP	2	1	9	9	8	8	6	19	17	14	10	15								
Kentucky	C	2	2	10	11	10	9	6	19	14	13	12	14								
LSU	AP	22	23	RV	RV		RV	RV				RV	RV								
LSU	C	24	24	RV	RV		RV	RV			RV	RV	RV								
Mississippi State	AP	RV	RV	RV	RV																
Mississippi State	C	RV	RV																		
Missouri	AP	RV	RV	RV	RV																
Missouri	C			RV																	
Ole Miss	AP																				
Ole Miss	C			RV																	
South Carolina	AP																				
South Carolina	C																				
Tennessee	AP	RV	RV	20	17	21	19	21	RV												
Tennessee	C	25	25	17	16	20	17	21	RV												
Texas A&M	AP																				
Texas A&M	C																				
Vanderbilt	AP																				
Vanderbilt	C																				

== Conference matrix ==
	Alabama	Arkansas	Auburn	Florida	Georgia	Kentucky	LSU	Miss. State	Missouri	Ole Miss	S. Carolina	Tennessee	Texas A&M	Vanderbilt
vs. Alabama	–	0–0	0–1	1–0	0–0	1–0	1–0	0–1	0–1	0–0	0–0	0–0	0–0	0–1
vs. Arkansas	0–0	–	0–0	0–0	0–0	1–0	1–0	1–0	0–0	0–1	1–0	0–0	0–1	0–1
vs. Auburn	1–0	0–0	–	1–0	0–1	0-0	0–0	0–1	0–0	0–1	0–1	0–0	0–0	0–1
vs. Florida	0–1	0–0	0–1	–	0–0	0-0	1–0	1–0	1–0	0–1	0–1	0–0	0–0	0–0
vs. Georgia	0-0	0–0	1–0	0–0	–	2–0	0–0	1–0	1–0	1–0	0–0	0–1	0–0	0–0
vs. Kentucky	0–1	0–1	0–0	0–0	0–2	–	0–0	0–0	0–1	0–0	1–0	0–0	0–0	0–1
vs. LSU	0–1	0–1	0–0	0–1	0–0	0–0	–	0–1	0–0	0–1	0–0	0–1	0–1	0–0
vs. Miss. State	1–0	0–1	1–0	0–1	0–1	0–0	1–0	–	0–1	0–0	0–0	0–0	0–0	0–0
vs. Missouri	1–0	0–0	0–0	0–1	0–1	1–0	0–0	1–0	–	0–0	0–0	1–0	1–0	0–0
vs. Ole Miss	0-0	1–0	1–0	1–0	0–1	0–0	1–0	0–0	0-0	–	0–0	1–0	1–0	0–0
vs. South Carolina	0-0	0–1	1–0	1–0	0–0	0–1	0–0	0–0	0-0	0–0	–	1–0	0–1	0–1
vs. Tennessee	0-0	0–0	0–0	0–0	1–0	0–0	1–0	0–0	0–1	0–1	0–1	–	1–0	0–1
vs. Texas A&M	0-0	1–0	0–0	0–0	0–0	0–0	1–0	0–0	0–1	0–1	1–0	0–1	–	0–1
vs. Vanderbilt	1–0	1–0	1–0	0–0	0–0	1–0	0–0	0–0	0-0	0–0	1–0	1–0	1–0	–
Total	4–3	3–4	5–2	4–3	1–6	6–1	7–0	4–3	2–5	1–6	4–3	4–3	4–3	0–7

== Postseason ==
=== SEC tournament ===
- March 11–15 at the Bridgestone Arena, Nashville. Teams will be seeded by conference record, with ties broken by record between the tied teams followed by record against the regular-season champion, if necessary.

**2019 SEC men's basketball tournament seeds and results**
Seed	School	Conf.	Over.	Tiebreaker	First Round March 11	Second Round March 12	Quarterfinals March 13	Semifinals March 14	Championship March 15
1.	‡**Kentucky**	15–3	25–6		Bye	Bye			
2.	†**Auburn**	12–6	25–6	1–0 vs. LSU	Bye	Bye			
3.	†**LSU**	12–6	21–10	0-1 vs. Auburn	Bye	Bye			
4.	†**Mississippi State**	11–7	20–11	1–0 vs. Florida	Bye	Bye			
5.	#**Florida**	11–7	19–12	0–1 vs. Mississippi State	Bye	vs. #13 Georgia			
6.	#**South Carolina**	10–8	18–13	2–0 vs. Texas A&M	Bye	vs. #11 Arkansas			
7.	#**Texas A&M**	10–8	16–14	0–2 vs, South Carolina	Bye	vs. #10 Missouri			
8.	#**Tennessee**	9–9	17–14		Bye	vs. #9 Alabama			
9.	#**Alabama**	8–10	16–15		Bye	vs. #8 Tennessee			
10.	#**Missouri**	7–11	15–16	1–0 vs. Arkansas	Bye	vs. #7 Texas A&M			
11.	**Arkansas**	7–11	19–12	0–1 vs. Missouri	vs. #14 Vanderbilt **W, 86–73**	vs. #6 South Carolina			
12.	**Ole Miss**	6–11	15–16		vs. #13 Georgia **L, 63–81**				
13.	**Georgia**	5–13	15–16		vs. #12 Ole Miss **W, 81–63**				
14.	**Vanderbilt**	3–15	11–20		vs. #11 Arkansas **L, 73–86**				
‡ – SEC regular season champions, and tournament No. 1 seed. † – Received a double-Bye in the conference tournament. # – Received a single-Bye in the conference tournament. Overall records include all games played in the SEC tournament.

== Honors and awards ==
=== All-SEC Awards ===
==== Coaches ====
**2020 SEC Men's Basketball Individual Awards**
Award	Recipient(s)
Player of the Year	Immanuel Quickley, Kentucky
Coach of the Year	John Calipari, Kentucky
Defensive Player of the Year	Yves Pons, Tennessee
Freshman of the Year	Anthony Edwards, Georgia
Scholar-Athlete of the Year	Skylar Mays, LSU
Sixth Man Award	Tyson Carter, Mississippi State

**2020 SEC Men's Basketball All-Conference Teams**
First Team	Second Team	All-Freshman Team	All-Defensive Team
Samir Doughty Sr., G, Auburn; Keyontae Johnson So., F, Florida; Mason Jones Jr., G, Arkansas; Kira Lewis Jr. So., G, Alabama; Skylar Mays Sr., G, LSU; Reggie Perry So., F, Mississippi State; Immanuel Quickley So., G, Kentucky; Nick Richards Jr., C, Kentucky; Breein Tyree Jr., G, Ole Miss	Kerry Blackshear Jr. Sr., F, Florida; Anthony Edwards Fr., G, Georgia; John Fulkerson Jr., F, Tennessee; Maik Kotsar Sr., F, South Carolina; Saben Lee Jr., G, Vanderbilt; Tyrese Maxey Fr., G, Kentucky; Isaac Okoro Fr., F, Auburn; John Petty Jr.Jr., G, Alabama	Jermaine Couisnard South Carolina; Anthony Edwards Georgia; Scottie Lewis Florida; Tyrese Maxey Kentucky; Isaac Okoro Auburn; Scotty Pippen Jr. Vanderbilt; Jaden Shackelford Alabama; Trendon Watford LSU	Ashton Hagans So., G, Kentucky; Herbert Jones Jr., F, Alabama; Isaac Okoro Fr., F, Auburn; Yves Pons Jr., F, Tennessee; Nick Richards Jr., G, Kentucky

==== AP ====
**2020 SEC Men's Basketball Individual Awards**
Award	Recipient(s)
co-Player of the Year	Mason Jones, Arkansas; Reggie Perry, Mississippi State
Coach of the Year	Buzz Williams, Texas A&M
Newcomer of the Year	Anthony Edwards, Georgia

**2020 SEC Men's Basketball All-Conference Teams**
First Team	Second Team
†Mason Jones Jr., G, Arkansas; Kira Lewis Jr. So., G, Alabama †Reggie Perry So., F, Mississippi State; Immanuel Quickley So., G, Kentucky; Nick Richards Jr., C, Kentucky	Samir Doughty Sr., G, Auburn; Anthony Edwards Fr., G, Georgia; Keyontae Johnson So., F, Florida; Skylar Mays Sr., G, LSU; Breein Tyree Sr., G, Ole Miss
† - denotes unanimous selection

== NBA draft ==
PG	Point guard	SG	Shooting guard	SF	Small forward	PF	Power forward	C	Center

Player	Team	Round	Pick #	Position	School	Nationality
Anthony Edwards	Minnesota Timberwolves	1	1	SG	Georgia	United States
Isaac Okoro	Cleveland Cavaliers	1	5	SF	Auburn	United States
Kira Lewis Jr.	New Orleans Pelicans	1	13	PG	Alabama	United States
Aaron Nesmith	Boston Celtics	1	14	SF	Vanderbilt	United States
Tyrese Maxey	Philadelphia 76ers	1	21	PG	Kentucky	United States
Immanuel Quickley	Oklahoma City Thunder	1	25	SG	Kentucky	United States
Saben Lee	Utah Jazz	2	38	PG	Vanderbilt	United States
Robert Woodard II	Memphis Grizzlies	2	40	SF	Mississippi State	United States
Nick Richards	New Orleans Pelicans	2	42	C	Kentucky	Jamaica
Isaiah Joe	Philadelphia 76ers	2	49	SG	Arkansas	United States
Skylar Mays	Atlanta Hawks	2	50	PG	LSU	United States
Reggie Perry	Los Angeles Clippers	2	57	PF	Mississippi State	United States
