= 2019–20 Florida Gators men's basketball team =

American college basketball season

2019–20 Florida Gators men's basketball

Charleston Classic champions
- Conference: Southeastern Conference
- Record: 19–12 (11–7 SEC)
- Head coach: Mike White (5th season)
- Associate head coach: Al Pinkins
- Assistant coaches: Jordan Mincy; Darris Nichols
- Home arena: Exactech Arena at the Stephen C. O'Connell Center

2019–20 Southeastern Conference men's basketball standings
| | Conf. | | | | Overall |
| Team | W | | L | PCT | W | | L | PCT |
|---|---|---|---|---|---|---|---|---|
| No. 8 Kentucky | 15 | – | 3 | .833 | 25 | – | 6 | .806 |
| No. 20 Auburn | 12 | – | 6 | .667 | 25 | – | 6 | .806 |
| LSU | 12 | – | 6 | .667 | 21 | – | 10 | .677 |
| Mississippi State | 11 | – | 7 | .611 | 20 | – | 11 | .645 |
| Florida | 11 | – | 7 | .611 | 19 | – | 12 | .613 |
| South Carolina | 10 | – | 8 | .556 | 18 | – | 13 | .581 |
| Texas A&M | 10 | – | 8 | .556 | 16 | – | 14 | .533 |
| Tennessee | 9 | – | 9 | .500 | 17 | – | 14 | .548 |
| Alabama | 8 | – | 10 | .444 | 16 | – | 15 | .516 |
| Arkansas | 7 | – | 11 | .389 | 20 | – | 12 | .625 |
| Missouri | 7 | – | 11 | .389 | 15 | – | 16 | .484 |
| Ole Miss | 6 | – | 12 | .333 | 15 | – | 17 | .469 |
| Georgia | 5 | – | 13 | .278 | 16 | – | 16 | .500 |
| Vanderbilt | 3 | – | 15 | .167 | 11 | – | 21 | .344 |
Note: The 2020 SEC tournament was canceled after the first round due to the COVID-19 pandemic. Rankings from AP poll

The 2019–20 Florida Gators men's basketball team represented the University of Florida in the 2019–20 NCAA Division I men's basketball season. The Gators were led by fifth-year head coach Mike White and played their home games in the Exactech Arena at the Stephen C. O'Connell Center on the university's Gainesville, Florida campus as members of the Southeastern Conference. They finished the season 19–12, 11–7 in SEC play to finish in a tie for fourth place. They were set to take on Georgia in the second round of the SEC tournament. However, the SEC Tournament and all other postseason tournaments were cancelled amid the COVID-19 pandemic.

== Previous season ==
The Gators finished the 2018–19 season 20–16, 9–9 in SEC play to finish in eighth place. They defeated Arkansas in the second round, LSU in the quarterfinals before losing to Auburn in the semifinals of the SEC tournament. They received an at-large bid to the NCAA tournament where they defeated Nevada in the First Round before losing in the Second Round to Michigan.

== Offseason ==
=== Departures ===
| Name | Number | Pos. | Height | Weight | Year | Hometown | Reason for departure |
|---|---|---|---|---|---|---|---|
| Mike Okauru | 0 | G | 6'3" | 184 | Sophomore | Raleigh, NC | Transferred to UNC Wilmington |
| Chase Johnson | 1 | F | 6'9" | 219 | RS Freshman | Ripley, WV | Transferred to Dayton |
| Jalen Hudson | 3 | G | 6'6" | 195 | RS Senior | Richmond, VA | Graduated |
| KeVaughn Allen | 5 | G | 6'2" | 193 | Senior | Little Rock, AR | Graduated |
| Kevarrius Hayes | 13 | C | 6'9" | 227 | Senior | Live Oak, FL | Graduated |
| Mak Krause | 14 | G | 6'2" | 172 | Senior | Atlanta, GA | Walk-on; graduated |
| Isaiah Stokes | 15 | F | 6'8" | 270 | RS Freshman | Aurora, ON | Transferred to Memphis |
| Andrew Fava | 22 | G | 5'10" | 171 | Sophomore | Baltimore, MD | Walk-on; left the team for personal reasons |
| Deaundrae Ballard | 24 | G | 6'5" | 197 | Sophomore | Atlanta, GA | Transferred to South Alabama |
| Keith Stone | 25 | F | 6'8" | 253 | RS Junior | Deerfield Beach, FL | Graduate Transferred to Miami (FL) |

=== Incoming transfers ===
| Name | Number | Pos. | Height | Weight | Year | Hometown | Previous School |
|---|---|---|---|---|---|---|---|
| Anthony Duruji | 4 | F | 6'7" | 215 | Junior | Germantown, MD | Louisiana Tech |
| Tyree Appleby | 22 | G | 6'1" | 165 | Junior | Jacksonville, AR | Cleveland State |
| Kerry Blackshear Jr. | 24 | F | 6'10" | 250 | Senior | Orlando, FL | Virginia Tech |

=== 2019 recruiting class ===
College recruiting information
| Name | Hometown | School | Height | Weight | Commit date |
|---|---|---|---|---|---|
| Scottie Lewis; SF | Colts Neck, NJ | Ranney School | 6 ft 5 in (1.96 m) | 185 lb (84 kg) | Oct 2, 2018 |
| Scottie Lewis; SF | Recruit ratings: Scout: Rivals: 247Sports: ESPN: (96) | | | | |
| Tre Mann; PG | The Villages, FL | The Villages Charter High School | 6 ft 4 in (1.93 m) | 185 lb (84 kg) | Aug 28, 2018 |
| Tre Mann; PG | Recruit ratings: Scout: Rivals: 247Sports: ESPN: (89) | | | | |
| Omar Payne; C | Kissimmee, FL | Montverde Academy | 6 ft 9 in (2.06 m) | 210 lb (95 kg) | Oct 1, 2018 |
| Omar Payne; C | Recruit ratings: Scout: Rivals: 247Sports: ESPN: (88) | | | | |
| Jason Jitoboh; C | Chattanooga, TN | Hamilton Heights Christian Academy | 6 ft 10 in (2.08 m) | 270 lb (120 kg) | Mar 28, 2019 |
| Jason Jitoboh; C | Recruit ratings: Scout: Rivals: 247Sports: ESPN: (80) | | | | |
| Alex Klatsky; PG | Tinton Falls, NJ | Ranney School | 6 ft 2 in (1.88 m) | 155 lb (70 kg) | Sep 11, 2018 |
| Alex Klatsky; PG | Recruit ratings: Scout: Rivals: 247Sports: ESPN: (60) | | | | |
| Jacques Glover; PG | Knoxville, TN | Bearden High School | 5 ft 11 in (1.80 m) | 175 lb (79 kg) | Apr 1, 2019 |
| Jacques Glover; PG | Recruit ratings: Scout: Rivals: 247Sports: ESPN: (NR) | | | | |
Overall recruit ranking:
Note: In many cases, Scout, Rivals, 247Sports, On3, and ESPN may conflict in their listings of height and weight.; In these cases, the average was taken. ESPN grades are on a 100-point scale.; Sources: "2019 Florida Basketball Commits". Scout.; "Scout.com Team Recruiting Rankings". Scout.; "2019 Team Ranking". Rivals.

== Preseason ==
=== SEC media poll ===
The SEC media poll was released on October 15, 2019.

Media poll
| Predicted finish | Team |
| 1 | Kentucky |
| 2 | Florida |
| 3 | LSU |
| 4 | Auburn |
| 5 | Tennessee |
| 6 | Alabama |
| 7 | Mississippi State |
| 8 | Ole Miss |
| 9 | Georgia |
| 10 | South Carolina |
| 11 | Arkansas |
| 12 | Texas A&M |
| 13 | Missouri |
| 14 | Vanderbilt |

=== Preseason All-SEC teams ===
The Gators had two players selected to the preseason all-SEC teams.

SEC Player of the Year

Kerry Blackshear

First Team

Kerry Blackshear

Second Team

Andrew Nembhard

== Roster ==
2019–20 Florida Gators men's basketball team
Players
Coaches

| Pos. | # | Name | Height | Weight | Year | Previous school | Hometown |
|---|---|---|---|---|---|---|---|
| G | 0 | Ques Glover | 5 ft 11 in (1.8 m) | 176 lb (80 kg) | Fr | Bearden High School | Knoxville, Tennessee |
| G | 1 | Tre Mann | 6 ft 4 in (1.93 m) | 172 lb (78 kg) | Fr | The Villages Charter Schools | Gainesville, Florida |
| G | 2 | Andrew Nembhard | 6 ft 5 in (1.96 m) | 193 lb (88 kg) | So | Montverde Academy | Aurora, Ontario |
| G | 3 | Alex Klatsky | 6 ft 3 in (1.91 m) | 189 lb (86 kg) | Fr | Ranney School | Colts Neck, New Jersey |
| F | 4 | Anthony Duruji (redshirt) | 6 ft 7 in (2.01 m) | 213 lb (97 kg) | Jr | Louisiana Tech | Germantown, Maryland |
| F | 5 | Omar Payne | 6 ft 10 in (2.08 m) | 223 lb (101 kg) | Fr | Montverde Academy | Kissimmee, Florida |
| G | 10 | Noah Locke | 6 ft 3 in (1.91 m) | 207 lb (94 kg) | So | McDonogh School | Randallstown, Maryland |
| F | 11 | Keyontae Johnson | 6 ft 5 in (1.96 m) | 231 lb (105 kg) | So | Oak Hill Academy | Norfolk, Virginia |
| C | 12 | Gorjok Gak | 6 ft 11 in (2.11 m) | 244 lb (111 kg) | Sr | Victory Rock Prep | Sydney, Australia |
| F | 21 | Dontay Bassett | 6 ft 9 in (2.06 m) | 236 lb (107 kg) | RS Jr | Oldsmar Christian School | Oakland, California |
| G | 22 | Tyree Appleby (redshirt) | 6 ft 1 in (1.85 m) | 163 lb (74 kg) | Jr | Cleveland State | Jacksonville, Arkansas |
| G | 23 | Scottie Lewis | 6 ft 5 in (1.96 m) | 185 lb (84 kg) | Fr | Ranney School | Hazlet, New Jersey |
| F | 24 | Kerry Blackshear Jr. | 6 ft 10 in (2.08 m) | 241 lb (109 kg) | RS Sr | Virginia Tech | Orlando, Florida |
| C | 33 | Jason Jitoboh | 6 ft 11 in (2.11 m) | 300 lb (136 kg) | Fr | Hamilton Heights Christian Academy | Abuja, Nigeria |

Head coach

- Mike White (Mississippi)

Assistant coach(es)

- Al Pinkens (NC State)
- Jordan Mincy (Kent State)
- Darris Nichols (West Virginia)

Legend

- (C) Team captain
- (S) Suspended
- (I) Ineligible
- (W) Walk-on
- Injured
- Current redshirt

Roster

== Schedule and results ==
| Date time, TV | Rank^{#} | Opponent^{#} | Result | Record | High points | High rebounds | High assists | Site (attendance) city, state |
Exhibition
| October 29, 2019*; 7:00 pm, SECN+ | No. 6 | Lynn | W 89–71 | – | 17 – Nembhard | 10 – Blackshear | 6 – Nembhard | O'Connell Center (7,593); Gainesville, FL |
Regular season
| November 5, 2019*; 7:00 pm, SECN | No. 6 | North Florida | W 74–59 | 1–0 | 20 – Blackshear | 10 – Blackshear | 4 – Nembhard | O'Connell Center (9,685); Gainesville, FL |
| November 10, 2019*; 1:00 pm, ESPN | No. 6 | Florida State; Sunshine Showdown | L 51–63 | 1–1 | 19 – Johnson | 13 – Blackshear | 3 – Nembhard | O'Connell Center (10,851); Gainesville, FL |
| November 14, 2019*; 7:00 pm, ESPN2 | No. 15 | Towson; Charleston Classic non bracket game | W 66–60 | 2–1 | 15 – Lewis | 13 – Blackshear | 9 – Nembhard | O'Connell Center (8,055); Gainesville, FL |
| November 17, 2019*; 3:00 pm, ESPN | No. 15 | at UConn | L 59–62 | 2–2 | 15 – Blackshear | 8 – Blackshear | 7 – Nembhard | Gampel Pavilion (10,167); Storrs, CT |
| November 21, 2019*; 2:00 pm, ESPN2 | | vs. Saint Joseph's; Charleston Classic quarterfinals | W 70–62 | 3–2 | 22 – Johnson | 12 – Johnson | 3 – Blackshear | TD Arena (2,914); Charleston, SC |
| November 22, 2019*; 12:00 pm, ESPN2 | | vs. Miami (FL); Charleston Classic semifinals | W 78–58 | 4–2 | 20 – Blackshear | 11 – Blackshear | 9 – Nembhard | TD Arena (3,245); Charleston, SC |
| November 24, 2019*; 8:30 pm, ESPN | | vs. No. 18 Xavier; Charleston Classic championship game | W 70–65 | 5–2 | 15 – 2 tied | 10 – Blackshear | 4 – Nembhard | TD Arena (4,233); Charleston, SC |
| November 29, 2019*; 9:00 pm, SECN | No. 24 | Marshall | W 73–67 | 6–2 | 14 – Glover | 7 – 2 tied | 4 – Nembhard | O'Connell Center (10,583); Gainesville, FL |
| December 7, 2019*; 12:00 pm, FOX | | at No. 24 Butler | L 62–76 | 6–3 | 17 – Blackshear | 5 – 2 tied | 5 – Nembhard | Hinkle Fieldhouse (9,303); Indianapolis, IN |
| December 17, 2019*; 7:00 pm, ESPN2 | | vs. Providence; Basketball Hall of Fame Invitational | W 83–51 | 7–3 | 19 – Johnson | 10 – Johnson | 7 – Nembhard | Barclays Center (5,064); Brooklyn, NY |
| December 21, 2019*; 2:30 pm, FS1 | | vs. Utah State; Orange Bowl Basketball Classic | L 62–65 | 7–4 | 22 – Blackshear | 14 – Blackshear | 4 – Nembhard | BB&T Center (8,927); Sunrise, FL |
| December 28, 2019*; 12:00 pm, SECN | | Long Beach State | W 102–63 | 8–4 | 21 – 2 tied | 10 – Locke | 13 – Nembhard | O'Connell Center (9,067); Gainesville, FL |
| January 4, 2020; 6:00 pm, ESPN2 | | Alabama | W 104–98 ^{2OT} | 9–4 (1–0) | 25 – Nembhard | 16 – Blackshear | 4 – 2 tied | O'Connell Center (9,350); Gainesville, FL |
| January 7, 2020; 7:00 pm, ESPNU | | at South Carolina | W 81–68 | 10–4 (2–0) | 21 – Nembhard | 9 – 2 tied | 10 – Nembhard | Colonial Life Arena (10,651); Columbia, SC |
| January 11, 2020; 8:30 pm, SECN | | at Missouri | L 75–91 | 10–5 (2–1) | 22 – Blackshear | 5 – Johnson | 4 – Nembhard | Mizzou Arena (9,001); Columbia, MO |
| January 14, 2020; 7:00 pm, ESPN2 | | Ole Miss | W 71–55 | 11–5 (3–1) | 15 – Johnson | 9 – Blackshear | 6 – Nembhard | O'Connell Center (9,545); Gainesville, FL |
| January 18, 2020; 1:30 pm, CBS | | No. 4 Auburn | W 69–47 | 12–5 (4–1) | 19 – Payne | 16 – Blackshear | 5 – Nembhard | O'Connell Center (10,756); Gainesville, FL |
| January 21, 2020; 7:00 pm, SECN | | at LSU | L 82–84 | 12–6 (4–2) | 16 – 2 tied | 9 – Johnson | 10 – Nembhard | Pete Maravich Assembly Center (10,479); Baton Rouge, LA |
| January 25, 2020*; 8:00 pm, ESPN | | No. 1 Baylor; Big 12/SEC Challenge | L 61–72 | 12–7 | 20 – Johnson | 5 – Johnson | 8 – Nembhard | O'Connell Center (11,092); Gainesville, FL |
| January 28, 2020; 7:00 pm, ESPN2 | | Mississippi State | L 71–78 | 12–8 (4–3) | 17 – Lewis | 7 – Blackshear | 3 – 2 tied | O'Connell Center (8,248); Gainesville, FL |
| February 1, 2020; 8:30 pm, SECN | | at Vanderbilt | W 61–55 | 13–8 (5–3) | 20 – Johnson | 7 – 2 tied | 4 – Nembhard | Memorial Gymnasium (9,582); Nashville, TN |
| February 5, 2020; 7:00 pm, ESPNU | | Georgia | W 81–75 | 14–8 (6–3) | 25 – Nembhard | 9 – Lewis | 3 – Nembhard | O'Connell Center (9,889); Gainesville, FL |
| February 8, 2020; 2:00 pm, ESPN2 | | at Ole Miss | L 51–68 | 14–9 (6–4) | 16 – Johnson | 10 – Johnson | 3 – 2 tied | The Pavilion at Ole Miss (7,760); Oxford, MS |
| February 12, 2020; 8:30 pm, SECN | | at Texas A&M | W 78–61 | 15–9 (7–4) | 24 – Nembhard | 10 – Johnson | 6 – Johnson | Reed Arena (6,237); College Station, TX |
| February 15, 2020; 8:00 pm, SECN | | Vanderbilt | W 84–66 | 16–9 (8–4) | 19 – Locke | 6 – 2 tied | 5 – Blackshear | O'Connell Center (10,151); Gainesville, FL |
| February 18, 2020; 7:00 pm, ESPNU | | Arkansas | W 73–59 | 17–9 (9–4) | 24 – Johnson | 10 – Johnson | 4 – Nembhard | O'Connell Center (9,023); Gainesville, FL |
| February 22, 2020; 6:00 pm, ESPN | | at No. 10 Kentucky; Rivalry | L 59–65 | 17–10 (9–5) | 19 – Johnson | 9 – Johnson | 6 – Nembhard | Rupp Arena (20,489); Lexington, KY |
| February 26, 2020; 9:00 pm, ESPN2 | | LSU | W 81–66 | 18–10 (10–5) | 25 – Johnson | 11 – Johnson | 5 – Johnson | O'Connell Center (10,002); Gainesville, FL |
| February 29, 2020; 2:00 pm, ESPN2 | | at Tennessee | L 58–63 | 18–11 (10–6) | 20 – Blackshear Jr. | 9 – Blackshear Jr. | 7 – Nembhard | Thompson–Boling Arena (19,743); Knoxville, TN |
| March 4, 2020; 7:00 pm, ESPNU | | at Georgia | W 68–54 | 19–11 (11–6) | 18 – Johnson | 11 – Johnson | 6 – Nembhard | Stegeman Coliseum (10,007); Athens, GA |
| March 7, 2020; 1:00 pm, CBS | | No. 6 Kentucky; Rivalry | L 70–71 | 19–12 (11–7) | 19 – Lewis | 5 – 2 tied | 8 – Nembhard | O'Connell Center (9,767); Gainesville, FL |
SEC Tournament
| March 12, 2020; 3:30 pm, SECN | (5) | vs. (13) Georgia; Second round | Cancelled due to the COVID-19 pandemic | | | | | Bridgestone Arena; Nashville, TN |
*Non-conference game. ^{#}Rankings from AP Poll. (#) Tournament seedings in parentheses. All times are in Eastern Time.

== Rankings ==
Ranking movements Legend: ██ Increase in ranking ██ Decrease in ranking — = Not ranked RV = Received votes
| | Week | | | | | | | | | | | | | | | | | | | |
| Poll | Pre | 1 | 2 | 3 | 4 | 5 | 6 | 7 | 8 | 9 | 10 | 11 | 12 | 13 | 14 | 15 | 16 | 17 | 18 | Final |
|---|---|---|---|---|---|---|---|---|---|---|---|---|---|---|---|---|---|---|---|---|
| AP | 6 | 15 | RV | 24 | RV | RV | RV | — | RV | — | — | RV | RV | — | — | RV | RV | — | RV | — |
| Coaches | 6 | 6^ | RV | 25 | RV | RV | — | — | RV | RV | — | RV | — | — | — | RV | — | — | — | — |

*AP does not release post-NCAA Tournament rankings
^Coaches did not release a poll this week.
