= 2019–20 Vanderbilt Commodores men's basketball team =

American college basketball season

2019–20 Vanderbilt Commodores men's basketball
- Conference: Southeastern Conference
- Record: 11–21 (3–15 SEC)
- Head coach: Jerry Stackhouse (1st season)
- Assistant coaches: David Grace (1st season); Adam Mazarei (1st season); Faragi Phillips (1st season)
- Home arena: Memorial Gymnasium

2019–20 Southeastern Conference men's basketball standings
	Conf.				Overall
Team	W		L	PCT	W		L	PCT
No. 8 Kentucky	15	–	3	.833	25	–	6	.806
No. 20 Auburn	12	–	6	.667	25	–	6	.806
LSU	12	–	6	.667	21	–	10	.677
Mississippi State	11	–	7	.611	20	–	11	.645
Florida	11	–	7	.611	19	–	12	.613
South Carolina	10	–	8	.556	18	–	13	.581
Texas A&M	10	–	8	.556	16	–	14	.533
Tennessee	9	–	9	.500	17	–	14	.548
Alabama	8	–	10	.444	16	–	15	.516
Arkansas	7	–	11	.389	20	–	12	.625
Missouri	7	–	11	.389	15	–	16	.484
Ole Miss	6	–	12	.333	15	–	17	.469
Georgia	5	–	13	.278	16	–	16	.500
Vanderbilt	3	–	15	.167	11	–	21	.344
Note: The 2020 SEC tournament was canceled after the first round due to the COVID-19 pandemic. Rankings from AP poll

The 2019–20 Vanderbilt Commodores men's basketball team represented Vanderbilt University in the 2019–20 NCAA Division I men's basketball season. They were coached by Jerry Stackhouse in his first season at Vanderbilt. The Commodores played their home games at Memorial Gymnasium in Nashville, Tennessee as members of the Southeastern Conference. They finished the season 11–21, 3–15 in SEC play to finish in last place. They lost in the first round of the SEC tournament to Arkansas.

Following a 90–64 loss to South Carolina on January 25, Vanderbilt tied Sewanee for the most consecutive conference losses in SEC history, 24, which was set from 1938 to 1940.

In the following game at Kentucky on January 29, the Commodores broke the SEC record for consecutive conference losses with 25.

== Previous season ==
They finished the season 9–23, 0–18 in SEC play to finish in 14th place. They are the first SEC team to go winless in a season since the 1953-1954 Georgia Tech team, and the first team ever in the 18 game conference schedule. They followed this winless in conference play season with a loss to Texas A&M in the first round of the SEC tournament, extending their losing streak to 20 games, to finish the season with a combined 0–19 conference record. As a result of the unprecedented season, third-year head coach Bryce Drew was fired on March 22, 2019.

== Offseason ==
=== Departures ===
Name	Number	Pos.	Height	Weight	Year	Hometown	Reason for departure
Darius Garland	10	G	6'2"	175	Freshman	Nashville, TN	Declared for the 2019 NBA draft
Simisola Shittu	11	F/C	6'10"	240	Freshman	Burlington, Ontario	Declared for the 2019 NBA draft
Joe Toye	2	G/F	6'7"	210	Senior	Chicago, IL	Graduated
Matt Ryan	32	F	6'8"	209	RS Senior	Cortlandt Manor, NY	Graduate transferred to Chattanooga
Yanni Wetzell	4	F/C	6'10"	240	RS Senior	Auckland, New Zealand	Graduate transferred to San Diego State

=== Incoming transfers ===
Name	Number	Pos.	Height	Weight	Year	Hometown	Previous School
D. J. Harvey	5	G	6'6"	185	Redshirt Junior	Hyattsville, MD	Transferred from Notre Dame. Under NCAA transfer rules, Harvey will have to sit out for the 2019–20 season. Will have two years of remaining eligibility.
Quentin Millora-Brown	42	F	6'9"	205	Redshirt Sophomore	Lorton, VA	Transferred from Rice. Under NCAA transfer rules, Millora-Brown will have to sit out for the 2019–20 season. Will have three years of remaining eligibility.
Issac McBride	13	G	6'1"	190	Redshirt Freshman	Little Rock, AR	Transferred from Kansas. Under NCAA transfer rules, McBride will have to sit out for the 2020–21 season. Will have four years of remaining eligibility.

=== 2019 recruiting class ===
College recruiting information
Name	Hometown	School	Height	Weight	Commit date
Dylan Disu; PF	Pflugerville, TX	Hendrickson High School	6 ft 8 in (2.03 m)	185 lb (84 kg)	Sep 4, 2018
Dylan Disu; PF	Recruit ratings: Scout: Rivals: 247Sports: ESPN:				
Scotty Pippen Jr. PG	Chatsworth, CA	Sierra Canyon School	6 ft 0 in (1.83 m)	160 lb (73 kg)	Jan 11, 2019
Scotty Pippen Jr. PG	Recruit ratings: Scout: Rivals: 247Sports: ESPN:				
Jordan Wright; SG	Baton Rouge, LA	The Dunham School	6 ft 6 in (1.98 m)	200 lb (91 kg)	Apr 26, 2019
Jordan Wright; SG	Recruit ratings: Scout: Rivals: 247Sports: ESPN: ×				
Oton Jankovic; PF	Zagreb, Croatia	Montverde Academy	6 ft 9 in (2.06 m)	205 lb (93 kg)	May 28, 2019
Oton Jankovic; PF	Recruit ratings: Scout: Rivals: 247Sports: ESPN:				
Overall recruit ranking:
Note: In many cases, Scout, Rivals, 247Sports, On3, and ESPN may conflict in their listings of height and weight.; In these cases, the average was taken. ESPN grades are on a 100-point scale.; Sources: "Vanderbilt 2019 Basketball Commitments". Rivals.; "ESPN". ESPN.; "2019 Team Ranking". Rivals.

== Preseason ==
=== SEC media poll ===
The SEC media poll was released on October 15, 2019.

Media poll
Predicted finish	Team
1	Kentucky
2	Florida
3	LSU
4	Auburn
5	Tennessee
6	Alabama
7	Mississippi State
8	Ole Miss
9	Georgia
10	South Carolina
11	Arkansas
12	Texas A&M
13	Missouri
14	Vanderbilt

== Roster ==
2019–20 Vanderbilt Commodores men's basketball team
Players
Coaches

Pos.	#	Name	Height	Weight	Year	Previous school	Hometown
G	0	Saben Lee	6 ft 2 in (1.88 m)	183 lb (83 kg)	Jr	Corona del Sol HS	Phoenix, AZ
F	1	Dylan Disu	6 ft 9 in (2.06 m)	220 lb (100 kg)	Fr	Hendrickson HS	Pflugerville, TX
G	2	Scotty Pippen Jr.	6 ft 1 in (1.85 m)	170 lb (77 kg)	Fr	Sierra Canyon School	Los Angeles, CA
G	3	Maxwell Evans	6 ft 2 in (1.88 m)	190 lb (86 kg)	Jr	Bellaire HS	Houston, TX
G/F	4	Jordan Wright	6 ft 5 in (1.96 m)	226 lb (103 kg)	Fr	The Dunham School	Baton Rouge, LA
G	5	D. J. Harvey (I) (redshirt)	6 ft 6 in (1.98 m)	235 lb (107 kg)	Jr	Notre Dame	Bowie, MD
G	10	Drew Weikert (W)	6 ft 0 in (1.83 m)	170 lb (77 kg)	So	Montgomery Bell Academy	Nashville, TN
G/F	11	Braelee Albert (W)	6 ft 5 in (1.96 m)	220 lb (100 kg)	Fr	Brentwood School	Los Angeles, CA
F	13	Matthew Moyer	6 ft 8 in (2.03 m)	229 lb (104 kg)	RS Jr	Syracuse	Gahanna, OH
G	14	Isaiah Rice	5 ft 11 in (1.8 m)	195 lb (88 kg)	Jr	Park Tudor School	Indianapolis, IN
F	15	Clevon Brown	6 ft 8 in (2.03 m)	232 lb (105 kg)	Sr	Winston Churchill HS	San Antonio, TX
G	21	Jon Jossell (W)	5 ft 9 in (1.75 m)	160 lb (73 kg)	Sr	Destiny Christian School	Arcadia, OK
F	24	Aaron Nesmith	6 ft 6 in (1.98 m)	213 lb (97 kg)	So	Porter-Gaud School	Charleston, SC
F	42	Quentin Millora-Brown (I) (redshirt)	6 ft 10 in (2.08 m)	229 lb (104 kg)	So	Rice	Lorton, VA
F/C	50	Ejike Obinna	6 ft 10 in (2.08 m)	243 lb (110 kg)	RS So	Virginia Academy	Enugu, Nigeria
F	55	Oton Jankovic	6 ft 10 in (2.08 m)	212 lb (96 kg)	Fr	Montverde Academy	Zagreb, Croatia

Head coach

- Jerry Stackhouse (North Carolina)

Assistant coach(es)

- David Grace (Park)
- Adam Mazarei (Redlands)
- Faragi Phillips (Mississippi Valley State)

Legend

- (C) Team captain
- (S) Suspended
- (I) Ineligible
- (W) Walk-on
- Injured
- Current redshirt

Roster

== Schedule ==
Date time, TV	Rank^{#}	Opponent^{#}	Result	Record	High points	High rebounds	High assists	Site (attendance) city, state
Exhibition
November 1, 2019*; 7:00 pm		Clark Atlanta	W 95–55	0–0	19 – Lee	5 – Moyer	6 – Pippen Jr.	Memorial Gymnasium (8,975); Nashville, TN
Non-conference regular season
November 6, 2019*; 7:00 pm, SECN+		Southeast Missouri State	W 83–65	1–0	25 – Nesmith	8 – Brown	6 – Pippen Jr.	Memorial Gymnasium (8,097); Nashville, TN
November 11, 2019*; 7:00 pm, SECN		Texas A&M–Corpus Christi	W 71–66	2–0	21 – Nesmith	8 – Brown	8 – Lee	Memorial Gymnasium (8,300); Nashville, TN
November 14, 2019*; 6:00 pm, ESPN+		at Richmond	L 92–93 ^{OT}	2–1	34 – Nesmith	8 – Brown	8 – Lee	Robins Center (5,602); Richmond, VA
November 20, 2019*; 7:00 pm, SECN+		Austin Peay; Vanderbilt Invitational	W 90–72	3–1	26 – Nesmith	7 – Obinna	9 – Lee	Memorial Gymnasium (8,732); Nashville, TN
November 22, 2019*; 8:00 pm, SECN+		South Carolina State; Vanderbilt Invitational	W 97–60	4–1	20 – Nesmith	11 – Disu	8 – Pippen Jr.	Memorial Gymnasium (8,725); Nashville, TN
November 25, 2019*; 7:00 pm, SECN+		Southeastern Louisiana; Vanderbilt Invitational	W 78–70	5–1	16 – Evans	8 – Lee	7 – Lee	Memorial Gymnasium (8,589); Nashville, TN
November 30, 2019*; 7:00 pm, SECN+		Tulsa; Vanderbilt Invitational	L 58–67	5–2	26 – Nesmith	6 – Nesmith	4 – Tied	Memorial Gymnasium (8,648); Nashville, TN
December 3, 2019*; 7:00 pm, SECN+		Buffalo	W 90–76	6–2	25 – Lee	8 – Brown	5 – Pippen Jr.	Memorial Gymnasium (8,489); Nashville, TN
December 14, 2019*; 7:00 pm, SECN+		Liberty	L 56–61	6–3	19 – Nesmith	7 – Disu	6 – Pippen Jr.	Memorial Gymnasium (9,045); Nashville, TN
December 18, 2019*; 5:30 pm, CBSSN		vs. Loyola–Chicago; Hall of Fame Showcase	L 70–78	6–4	23 – Nesmith	7 – Tied	5 – Lee	Talking Stick Resort Arena; Phoenix, AZ
December 22, 2019*; 7:00 pm, SECN+		UNC Wilmington	W 88–73	7–4	34 – Nesmith	9 – Disu	7 – Pippen Jr.	Memorial Gymnasium (9,127); Nashville, TN
December 30, 2019*; 7:00 pm, SECN+		Davidson	W 76–71	8–4	18 – Pippen Jr.	10 – Disu	4 – Lee	Memorial Gymnasium (9,640); Nashville, TN
January 4, 2020*; 8:00 pm, SECN		SMU; American/SEC Alliance	L 81–92 ^{OT}	8–5	29 – Nesmith	7 – Lee	6 – Pippen Jr.	Memorial Gymnasium (9,141); Nashville, TN
SEC regular season
January 8, 2020; 8:00 pm, SECN		at No. 5 Auburn	L 79–83	8–6 (0–1)	27 – Lee	7 – Tied	5 – Pippen Jr.	Auburn Arena (9,121); Auburn, AL
January 11, 2020; 2:30 pm, SECN		Texas A&M	L 50–69	8–7 (0–2)	12 – Tied	7 – Obinna	4 – Lee	Memorial Gymnasium (9,076); Nashville, TN
January 15, 2020; 7:30 pm, SECN		at Arkansas	L 55–75	8–8 (0–3)	17 – Lee	10 – Disu	4 – Tied	Bud Walton Arena (14,321); Fayetteville, AR
January 18, 2020; 5:00 pm, SECN		Tennessee	L 45–66	8–9 (0–4)	16 – Pippen Jr.	7 – Evans	1 – Tied	Memorial Gymnasium (12,693); Nashville, TN
January 22, 2020; 8:00 pm, SECN		Alabama	L 62–77	8–10 (0–5)	21 – Disu	7 – Evans	3 – Tied	Memorial Gymnasium (9,019); Nashville, TN
January 25, 2020; 7:00 pm, SECN		at South Carolina	L 64–90	8–11 (0–6)	17 – Lee	5 – Tied	3 – Lee	Colonial Life Arena (12,393); Columbia, SC
January 29, 2020; 5:30 pm, SECN		at No. 13 Kentucky	L 62–71	8–12 (0–7)	21 – Lee	11 – Disu	4 – Lee	Rupp Arena (20,311); Lexington, KY
February 1, 2020; 7:30 pm, SECN		Florida	L 55–61	8–13 (0–8)	15 – Pippen Jr.	12 – Obinna	3 – Lee	Memorial Gymnasium (9,582); Nashville, TN
February 5, 2020; 8:00 pm, SECN		No. 18 LSU	W 99–90	9–13 (1–8)	33 – Lee	5 – Tied	6 – Lee	Memorial Gymnasium (9,256); Nashville, TN
February 8, 2020; 7:30 pm, SECN		at Mississippi State	L 70–80	9–14 (1–9)	20 – Lee	7 – Wright	4 – Lee	Humphrey Coliseum (7,642); Starkville, MS
February 11, 2020; 6:00 pm, ESPN		No. 12 Kentucky	L 64–78	9–15 (1–10)	20 – Lee	10 – Disu	5 – Pippen Jr.	Memorial Gymnasium (11,598); Nashville, TN
February 15, 2020; 7:00 pm, SECN		at Florida	L 66–84	9–16 (1–11)	23 – Lee	7 – Lee	6 – Pippen Jr.	O'Connell Center (10,151); Gainesville, FL
February 18, 2020; 5:30 pm, SECN		at Tennessee	L 61–65	9–17 (1–12)	23 – Wright	7 – Obinna	5 – Pippen Jr.	Thompson–Boling Arena (18,562); Knoxville, TN
February 22, 2020; 5:00 pm, SECN		Georgia	L 78–80	9–18 (1–13)	34 – Lee	6 – Obinna	4 – Lee	Memorial Gymnasium (10,378); Nashville, TN
February 26, 2020; 8:00 pm, ESPNU		Missouri	L 52–61	9–19 (1–14)	19 – Pippen Jr.	7 – Evans	3 – Evans	Memorial Gymnasium (8,497); Nashville, TN
February 29, 2020; 12:00 pm, SECN		at Ole Miss	L 60–86	9–20 (1–15)	13 – Obinna	5 – Tied	5 – Lee	The Pavilion at Ole Miss (7,495); Oxford, MS
March 3, 2020; 7:30 pm, SECN		at Alabama	W 87–79	10–20 (2–15)	38 – Lee	8 – Tied	5 – Lee	Coleman Coliseum (9,071); Tuscaloosa, AL
March 7, 2020; 11:30 am, SECN		South Carolina	W 83–74	11–20 (3–15)	21 – Pippen Jr.	12 – Obinna	4 – Tied	Memorial Gymnasium (10,852); Nashville, TN
SEC tournament
March 11, 2020; 8:30 pm, SECN	(14)	vs. (11) Arkansas; First round	L 73–86	11–21	30 – Lee	10 – Disu	4 – Evans	Bridgestone Arena; Nashville, TN
*Non-conference game. ^{#}Rankings from AP Poll. (#) Tournament seedings in parentheses. All times are in Central Time.

== See also ==
- 2019–20 Vanderbilt Commodores women's basketball team
