= 2019–20 Georgia Bulldogs basketball team =

American college basketball season

2019–20 Georgia Bulldogs basketball
- Conference: Southeastern Conference
- Record: 16–16 (5–13 SEC)
- Head coach: Tom Crean (2nd season)
- Assistant coaches: Joe Scott; Chad Dollar; John Linehan
- Home arena: Stegeman Coliseum

2019–20 Southeastern Conference men's basketball standings
	Conf.				Overall
Team	W		L	PCT	W		L	PCT
No. 8 Kentucky	15	–	3	.833	25	–	6	.806
No. 20 Auburn	12	–	6	.667	25	–	6	.806
LSU	12	–	6	.667	21	–	10	.677
Mississippi State	11	–	7	.611	20	–	11	.645
Florida	11	–	7	.611	19	–	12	.613
South Carolina	10	–	8	.556	18	–	13	.581
Texas A&M	10	–	8	.556	16	–	14	.533
Tennessee	9	–	9	.500	17	–	14	.548
Alabama	8	–	10	.444	16	–	15	.516
Arkansas	7	–	11	.389	20	–	12	.625
Missouri	7	–	11	.389	15	–	16	.484
Ole Miss	6	–	12	.333	15	–	17	.469
Georgia	5	–	13	.278	16	–	16	.500
Vanderbilt	3	–	15	.167	11	–	21	.344
Note: The 2020 SEC tournament was canceled after the first round due to the COVID-19 pandemic. Rankings from AP poll

The 2019–20 Georgia bulldogs basketball team represented the University of Georgia during the 2019–20 NCAA Division I men's basketball season. The team's head coach was Tom Crean, in his second year at Georgia. They played their home games at Stegeman Coliseum in Athens, Georgia as members of the Southeastern Conference. They finished the season 16–16, 5–13 in SEC play to finish in 13th place. They defeated Ole Miss in the first round of the SEC tournament and were set to take on Florida in the second round. However, the remainder of the SEC Tournament was cancelled amid the COVID-19 pandemic.

== Previous season ==
The Bulldogs finished the 2018–19 season 11–21, 2–16 in SEC play to finish in thirteenth place. As the No. 13 seed in the SEC tournament, they were defeated by Missouri in the first round.

== Offseason ==
=== Departures ===
Name	Number	Pos.	Height	Weight	Year	Hometown	Reason for departure
William Jackson II	0	G	6'4"	185	Senior	Athens, GA	Graduated
TeShaun Hightower	1	G	6'4"	190	Sophomore	Lithonia, GA	Transferred to Tulane
JoJo Toppin	5	F	6'6"	190	Freshman	Norcross, GA	Transferred to Georgia State
Jack Herring	10	F	6'8"	210	Freshman	Memphis, TN	Walk-on; not on team roster
Christian Harrison	11	G	6'4"	200	RS Senior	Atlanta, GA	Walk-on; graduate transferred
E'Torrion Wilridge	13	F	6'6"	220	Senior	Beaumont, TX	Graduated
Connor O'Neill	24	F	6'6"	220	Senior	Roswell, GA	Walk-on; graduated
Mike Edwards	32	F	6'9"	235	Senior	Westland, MI	Graduated
Nic Claxton	33	F	6'11"	220	Sophomore	Greenville, SC	Declared for the 2019 NBA draft; selected 31st overall by the Brooklyn Nets
Derek Ogbeide	34	F	6'9"	250	Senior	Atlanta, GA	Graduated
Ignas Sargiūnas	43	G	6'5"	205	Freshman	Kaunas, Lithuania	Transferred to Colorado State

=== Incoming transfers ===
Name	Number	Pos.	Height	Weight	Year	Hometown	Previous School
Donnell Gresham Jr.	0	G	6'1"	203	RS Senior	St. Paul, MN	Northeastern

=== 2019 recruiting class ===
College recruiting information
Name	Hometown	School	Height	Weight	Commit date
Jaykwon Walton; SF	Columbus, GA	Carver-Montgomery (AL)	6 ft 6 in (1.98 m)	196 lb (89 kg)	Aug 20, 2018
Jaykwon Walton; SF	Recruit ratings: Rivals: 247Sports: ESPN: (85)				
Toumani Camara; SF	Brussels, Belgium	Chaminade-Madonna College Prep (FL)	6 ft 6 in (1.98 m)	200 lb (91 kg)	Oct 1, 2018
Toumani Camara; SF	Recruit ratings: Rivals: 247Sports: ESPN: (83)				
Anthony Edwards; SG	Atlanta, GA	Holy Spirit Prep (GA)	6 ft 4 in (1.93 m)	205 lb (93 kg)	Feb 11, 2019
Anthony Edwards; SG	Recruit ratings: Rivals: 247Sports: ESPN: (96)				
Christian Brown; SF	Hopkins, SC	Oak Hill Academy (VA)	6 ft 6 in (1.98 m)	210 lb (95 kg)	Mar 15, 2019
Christian Brown; SF	Recruit ratings: Rivals: 247Sports: ESPN: (87)				
Sahvir Wheeler; PG	Houston, TX	Houston Christian (TX)	5 ft 9 in (1.75 m)	175 lb (79 kg)	May 6, 2019
Sahvir Wheeler; PG	Recruit ratings: Rivals: 247Sports: ESPN: (84)				
Rodney Howard; C	Ypsilanti, MI	Legacy Charter School (SC)	6 ft 10 in (2.08 m)	230 lb (100 kg)	May 29, 2019
Rodney Howard; C	Recruit ratings: Rivals: 247Sports: ESPN: (N/A)				
Mike Peake; PF	Chicago, IL	Blue Valley Northwest (KS)	6 ft 7 in (2.01 m)	220 lb (100 kg)	Aug 5, 2019
Mike Peake; PF	Recruit ratings: Rivals: 247Sports: ESPN: (N/A)				
Overall recruit ranking: Rivals: 3 247Sports: 11 ESPN: 5
Note: In many cases, Scout, Rivals, 247Sports, On3, and ESPN may conflict in their listings of height and weight.; In these cases, the average was taken. ESPN grades are on a 100-point scale.; Sources: "Georgia 2019 Basketball Commitments". Rivals.; "2019 Georgia Bulldogs Recruiting Class". ESPN.; "2019 Team Ranking". Rivals.

== Preseason ==
=== SEC media poll ===
The SEC media poll was released on October 15, 2019.

Media poll
Predicted finish	Team
1	Kentucky
2	Florida
3	LSU
4	Auburn
5	Tennessee
6	Alabama
7	Mississippi State
8	Ole Miss
9	Georgia
10	South Carolina
11	Arkansas
12	Texas A&M
13	Missouri
14	Vanderbilt

=== Preseason All-SEC teams ===
The Bulldogs had one player selected to the preseason all-SEC teams.

First Team

Anthony Edwards

== Roster ==
2019–20 Georgia Bulldogs men's basketball team
Players
Coaches

Pos.	#	Name	Height	Weight	Year	Previous school	Hometown
G	0	Donnell Gresham Jr.	6 ft 3 in (1.91 m)	195 lb (88 kg)	RS Sr	Northeastern	St. Paul, MN
F	1	Jaykwon Walton	6 ft 7 in (2.01 m)	205 lb (93 kg)	Fr	Carver-Montgomery HS	Columbus, GA
G	2	Jordan Harris	6 ft 5 in (1.96 m)	195 lb (88 kg)	Sr	Seminole County HS	Iron City, GA
F	3	Christian Brown	6 ft 6 in (1.98 m)	215 lb (98 kg)	Fr	Oak Hill Academy	Hopkins, SC
G	4	Tyree Crump	6 ft 1 in (1.85 m)	185 lb (84 kg)	Sr	Bainbridge HS	Bainbridge, GA
G	5	Anthony Edwards	6 ft 5 in (1.96 m)	225 lb (102 kg)	Fr	Holy Spirit Prep	Atlanta, GA
F	10	Toumani Camara	6 ft 8 in (2.03 m)	220 lb (100 kg)	Fr	Chaminade-Madonna College Prep	Brussels, Belgium
G	11	Jaxon Etter (W)	6 ft 4 in (1.93 m)	205 lb (93 kg)	Fr	Etowah HS	Woodstock, GA
G	14	Tye Fagan	6 ft 3 in (1.91 m)	185 lb (84 kg)	So	Upson-Lee HS	Thomaston, GA
G	15	Sahvir Wheeler	5 ft 10 in (1.78 m)	180 lb (82 kg)	Fr	Houston Christian HS	Houston, TX
F	20	Rayshaun Hammonds	6 ft 9 in (2.06 m)	235 lb (107 kg)	Jr	Norcross HS	Norcross, GA
C	24	Rodney Howard	6 ft 11 in (2.11 m)	245 lb (111 kg)	Fr	Legacy Charter School	Ypsilanti, MI
F	30	Mike Peake	6 ft 8 in (2.03 m)	220 lb (100 kg)	Fr	Blue Valley Northwest HS	Chicago, IL
G	32	Stan Turnier (W)	6 ft 4 in (1.93 m)	185 lb (84 kg)	Fr	Trinity HS	Louisville, KY

Head coach

- Tom Crean (Central Michigan)

Assistant coach(es)

- Joe Scott (Princeton)
- Chad Dollar (South Florida)
- John Linehan (Providence)

Legend

- (C) Team captain
- (S) Suspended
- (I) Ineligible
- (W) Walk-on
- Injured
- Current redshirt

Roster
Last update: October 12, 2019

== Schedule and results ==
Date time, TV	Rank^{#}	Opponent^{#}	Result	Record	High points	High rebounds	High assists	Site (attendance) city, state
Exhibition
October 18, 2019*; 7:00 pm		Valdosta State	W 93–81	–	18 – Edwards	7 – Edwards/Wheeler	6 – Camara	Stegeman Coliseum (N/A); Athens, GA
October 25, 2019*; 7:00 pm		at Charlotte	W 77–69	–	19 – Crump	7 – Crump/Hammonds	4 – Wheeler	Dale F. Halton Arena (2,117); Charlotte, NC
Non-conference regular season
November 5, 2019*; 7:00 pm, SECN+		Western Carolina	W 92–71	1–0	24 – Edwards	12 – Hammonds	4 – Fagan	Stegeman Coliseum (8,722); Athens, GA
November 12, 2019*; 7:00 pm, SECN+		The Citadel	W 95–86	2–0	29 – Edwards	9 – Hammonds	8 – Wheeler	Stegeman Coliseum (8,058); Athens, GA
November 15, 2019*; 7:00 pm, SECN+		Delaware State; Maui Invitational tournament campus site game	W 100–56	3–0	26 – Hammonds	14 – Hammonds	7 – Edwards/Wheeler	Stegeman Coliseum (8,167); Athens, GA
November 20, 2019*; 7:00 pm, SECN+		Georgia Tech	W 82–78	4–0	26 – Hammonds	9 – Hammonds	5 – Wheeler	Stegeman Coliseum (10,205); Athens, GA
November 25, 2019*; 2:30 pm, ESPN2		vs. Dayton; Maui Invitational Tournament quarterfinals	L 61–80	4–1	11 – Fagan	4 – Hammonds	4 – Wheeler	Lahaina Civic Center (2,400); Lahaina, HI
November 26, 2019*; 2:30 pm, ESPN2		vs. No. 3 Michigan State; Maui Invitational Tournament conslation 2nd round	L 85–93	4–2	37 – Edwards	6 – Edwards	4 – Wheeler	Lahaina Civic Center (2,400); Lahaina, HI
November 27, 2019*; 9:00 pm, ESPNU		vs. Chaminade; Maui Invitational Tournament 7th place game	W 80–77	5–2	24 – Edwards	8 – Hammonds	3 – Gresham, Jr.	Lahaina Civic Center (2,400); Lahaina, HI
December 4, 2019*; 7:00 pm, SECN+		North Carolina Central	W 95–59	6–2	21 – Edwards	9 – Hammonds	6 – Wheeler	Stegeman Coliseum (7,738); Athens, GA
December 14, 2019*; 8:00 pm, P12N		at Arizona State	L 59–79	6–3	15 – Fagan	8 – Hammonds	4 – Wheeler	Desert Financial Arena (9,067); Tempe, AZ
December 20, 2019*; 7:00 pm, SECN		SMU	W 87–85 ^{2OT}	7–3	21 – Hammonds	11 – Hammonds	8 – Wheeler	Stegeman Coliseum (10,351); Athens, GA
December 23, 2019*; 7:00 pm, SECN		Georgia Southern	W 73–64	8–3	23 – Edwards	10 – Hammonds	7 – Wheeler	Stegeman Coliseum (10,412); Athens, GA
December 30, 2019*; 7:00 pm, SECN+		Austin Peay	W 78–48	9–3	17 – Hammonds	9 – Camara	6 – Wheeler	Stegeman Coliseum (9,800); Athens, GA
January 4, 2020*; 1:00 pm, CBS		at No. 9 Memphis; American/SEC Alliance	W 65–62	10–3	15 – Hammonds	12 – Hammonds	7 – Wheeler	FedExForum (17,272); Memphis, TN
SEC regular season
January 7, 2020; 9:00 pm, ESPN		No. 14 Kentucky	L 69–78	10–4 (0–1)	23 – Edwards	6 – Camara	3 – Harris/Wheeler	Stegeman Coliseum (10,523); Athens, GA
January 11, 2020; 12:00 pm, ESPNews		at No. 5 Auburn	L 60–82	10–5 (0–2)	18 – Edwards	9 – Hammonds	3 – Tied	Auburn Arena (9,121); Auburn, AL
January 15, 2020; 7:00 pm, ESPNU		Tennessee	W 80–63	11–5 (1–2)	26 – Edwards	7 – Gresham Jr.	4 – Wheeler	Stegeman Coliseum (10,313); Athens, GA
January 18, 2020; 8:30 pm, SECN		at Mississippi State	L 59–91	11–6 (1–3)	19 – Edwards	4 – Hammonds	4 – Edwards	Humphrey Coliseum (6,585); Starkville, MS
January 21, 2020; 7:00 pm, ESPN		at No. 15 Kentucky	L 79–89	11–7 (1–4)	16 – Tied	8 – Hammonds	3 – Edwards	Rupp Arena (20,135); Lexington, TX
January 25, 2020; 5:30 pm, SECN		Ole Miss	L 60–70	11–8 (1–5)	15 – Harris	8 – Harris	4 – Hammonds	Stegeman Coliseum (10,523); Athens, GA
January 28, 2020; 8:30 pm, SECN		at Missouri	L 69–72	11–9 (1–6)	23 – Edwards	10 – Edwards	3 – Edwards	Mizzou Arena (8,541); Columbia, MO
February 1, 2020; 1:30 pm, SECN		Texas A&M	W 63–48	12–9 (2–6)	29 – Edwards	15 – Edwards	5 – Wheeler	Stegeman Coliseum (10,156); Athens, GA
February 5, 2020; 7:00 pm, ESPNU		at Florida	L 75–81	12–10 (2–7)	32 – Edwards	6 – Edwards	4 – Wheeler	O'Connell Center (9,889); Gainesville, FL
February 8, 2020; 6:00 pm, SECN		Alabama	L 102–105 ^{OT}	12–11 (2–8)	24 – Wheeler	12 – Edwards	8 – Wheeler	Stegeman Coliseum (10,041); Athens, GA
February 12, 2020; 6:30 pm, SECN		South Carolina	L 59–75	12–12 (2–9)	16 – Edwards	6 – Howard	2 – Tied	Stegeman Coliseum (8,857); Athens, GA
February 15, 2020; 3:30 pm, SECN		at Texas A&M	L 69–74	12–13 (2–10)	15 – Hammonds	7 – Hammonds	7 – Wheeler	Reed Arena (7,106); College Station, TX
February 19, 2020; 7:00 pm, ESPN2		No. 13 Auburn	W 65–55	13–13 (3–10)	18 – Edwards	8 – Hammonds	4 – Wheeler	Stegeman Coliseum (10,181); Athens, GA
February 22, 2020; 6:00 pm, SECN		at Vanderbilt	W 80–78	14–13 (4–10)	19 – Edwards	5 – Tied	5 – Wheeler	Memorial Gymnasium (10,378); Nashville, TN
February 26, 2020; 6:30 pm, SECN		at South Carolina	L 90–94 ^{OT}	14–14 (4–11)	36 – Edwards	9 – Hammonds	4 – Edwards	Colonial Life Arena (11,613); Columbia, SC
February 29, 2020; 6:00 pm, SECN		Arkansas	W 99–89	15–14 (5–11)	26 – Edwards	9 – Tied	3 – Tied	Stegeman Coliseum (10,017); Athens, GA
March 4, 2020; 7:00 pm, ESPNU		Florida	L 54–68	15–15 (5–12)	14 – Edwards	10 – Hammonds	6 – Wheeler	Stegeman Coliseum (10,007); Athens, GA
March 7, 2020; 2:00 pm, ESPN2		at LSU	L 64–94	15–16 (5–13)	17 – Edwards	8 – Hammonds	2 – Tied	Pete Maravich Assembly Center (11,697); Baton Rouge, LA
SEC tournament
March 11, 2020; 7:00 pm, SECN	(13)	vs. (12) Ole Miss; First round	W 81–63	16–16	22 – Hammonds	11 – Hammonds	8 – Wheeler	Bridgestone Arena; Nashville, TN
March 12, 2020; 3:30 pm, SECN	(13)	vs. (5) Florida; Second round	Cancelled due to the COVID-19 pandemic					Bridgestone Arena; Nashville, TN
*Non-conference game. ^{#}Rankings from AP Poll. (#) Tournament seedings in parentheses. All times are in Eastern Time.

'Schedule Source:'Schedule Source:
