= 2020 SEC men's basketball tournament =

American college basketball postseason tournament

- Classification: Division I
- Season: 2019–20
- Teams: 14
- Site: Bridgestone Arena; Nashville, Tennessee
- Television: SEC Network, ESPN

2019–20 Southeastern Conference men's basketball standings
	Conf.				Overall
Team	W		L	PCT	W		L	PCT
No. 8 Kentucky	15	–	3	.833	25	–	6	.806
No. 20 Auburn	12	–	6	.667	25	–	6	.806
LSU	12	–	6	.667	21	–	10	.677
Mississippi State	11	–	7	.611	20	–	11	.645
Florida	11	–	7	.611	19	–	12	.613
South Carolina	10	–	8	.556	18	–	13	.581
Texas A&M	10	–	8	.556	16	–	14	.533
Tennessee	9	–	9	.500	17	–	14	.548
Alabama	8	–	10	.444	16	–	15	.516
Arkansas	7	–	11	.389	20	–	12	.625
Missouri	7	–	11	.389	15	–	16	.484
Ole Miss	6	–	12	.333	15	–	17	.469
Georgia	5	–	13	.278	16	–	16	.500
Vanderbilt	3	–	15	.167	11	–	21	.344
Note: The 2020 SEC tournament was canceled after the first round due to the COVID-19 pandemic. Rankings from AP poll

The 2020 Southeastern Conference men's basketball tournament was a postseason men's basketball tournament for the Southeastern Conference at Bridgestone Arena in Nashville, Tennessee, scheduled for March 11–15, 2020. On March 12, after the tournament had begun, the SEC cancelled the remaining games due to the spread of COVID-19.

By rule, Kentucky was symbolically awarded the NCAA championship bid, even though it was not held, and officially was the SEC champions.

== Seeds ==
All 14 SEC schools were slated to participate in the tournament. Teams were seeded by conference record, with a tiebreaker system used to seed teams with identical conference records. The top 10 teams received a first round bye and the top four teams received a double bye, automatically advancing them into the quarterfinals.

Seed	School	Conf.	Tiebreak 1	Tiebreak 2	Tiebreak 3
1	Kentucky	15–3			
2	Auburn	12–6	1–0 vs. LSU		
3	LSU	12–6	0–1 vs. Auburn		
4	Mississippi State	11–7	1–0 vs. Florida		
5	Florida	11–7	0–1 vs. Mississippi State		
6	South Carolina	10–8	2–0 vs. Texas A&M		
7	Texas A&M	10–8	0–2 vs. South Carolina		
8	Tennessee	9–9			
9	Alabama	8–10			
10	Missouri	7–11	1–1 vs. Arkansas	0–1 vs. Kentucky	1–0 vs. Auburn
11	Arkansas	7–11	1–1 vs. Missouri	0–1 vs. Kentucky	0–1 vs. Auburn
12	Ole Miss	6–12			
13	Georgia	5–13			
14	Vanderbilt	3–15			

== Schedule ==
Session	Game	Time*	Matchup^{#}	Score	Television	Attendance
First round – Wednesday, March 11
1	1	6:00 pm	No. 12 Ole Miss vs. No. 13 Georgia	63–81	SEC Network	0
1	2	8:30 pm	No. 11 Arkansas vs. No. 14 Vanderbilt	86–73	SEC Network	0
Second round – Thursday, March 12
2	3	12:00 pm	No. 8 Tennessee vs. No. 9 Alabama	cancelled	SEC Network	
2	4	2:30 pm	No. 5 Florida vs. No. 13 Georgia	cancelled	SEC Network	
3	5	6:00 pm	No. 7 Texas A&M vs. No. 10 Missouri	cancelled	SEC Network	
3	6	8:30 pm	No. 6 South Carolina vs. No. 11 Arkansas	cancelled	SEC Network	
Quarterfinals – Friday, March 13
4	7	12:00 pm	No. 1 Kentucky vs. Game 3 winner	cancelled	ESPN	
4	8	2:30 pm	No. 4 Mississippi State vs. Game 4 winner	cancelled	ESPN	
5	9	6:00 pm	No. 2 Auburn vs. Game 5 winner	cancelled	SEC Network	
5	10	8:30 pm	No. 3 LSU vs. Game 6 winner	cancelled	SEC Network	
Semifinals – Saturday, March 14
6	11	12:00 pm	Game 7 winner vs. Game 8 winner	cancelled	ESPN	
6	12	2:30 pm	Game 9 winner vs. Game 10 winner	cancelled	ESPN	
Championship – Sunday, March 15
7	13	12:00 pm	Game 11 winner vs. Game 12 winner	cancelled	ESPN	

*Game times in Central Time. #Rankings denote tournament seeding.

== Bracket ==
First round Wednesday, March 11; SEC Network
12	Ole Miss	63
13	Georgia	81
11	Arkansas	86
14	Vanderbilt	73

Second round Thursday, March 12; SEC Network
8	Tennessee
9	Alabama
5	Florida
13	Georgia
7	Texas A&M
10	Missouri
6	South Carolina
11	Arkansas

Quarterfinals; Friday, March 13; ESPN/SEC Network
1	Kentucky
4	Mississippi State
2	Auburn
3	LSU

Semifinals; Saturday, March 14; ESPN

Championship; Sunday, March 15; ESPN

== Game summaries ==
=== First round ===
SECN

March 11
6:00 pm

No. 13 Georgia 81, No. 12 Ole Miss 63
Scoring by half: 41–30, 40–33
Pts: R. Hammonds 22; Rebs: R. Hammonds 11; Asts: S. Wheeler 8	Pts: B. Tyree 18; Rebs: K. Buffen 8 Asts: Tied 2

Bridgestone Arena
Nashville, TN
Attendance: 0
Referees: Don Daily, Bart Lenox, Josue Nieves

SECN

March 11
8:23 pm

No. 14 Vanderbilt 73, No. 11 Arkansas 86
Scoring by half: 26–38, 47–48
Pts: S. Lee 30; Rebs: D. Disu 10; Asts: M. Evans 4	Pts: M. Jones 22; Rebs: J. Whitt Jr. 7 Asts: M. Jones 6

Bridgestone Arena
Nashville, TN
Attendance: 0
Referees: Chuck Jones, Steven Anderson, Todd Austin

== See also ==
- 2020 SEC women's basketball tournament
