= Kahlil Whitney =

American basketball player (born 2001)

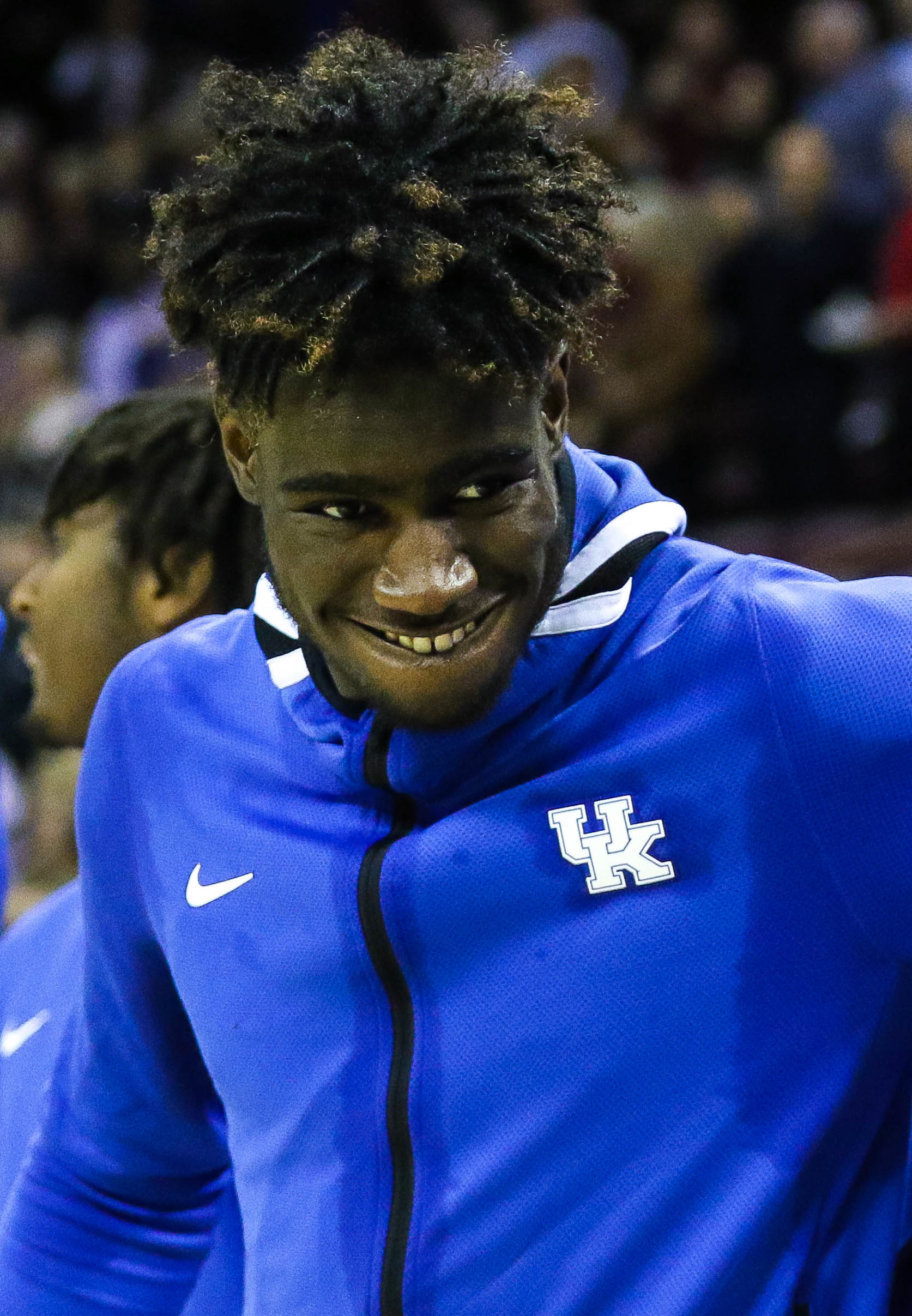
- Whitney in January 2020

Suke Lions
- Position: Small forward
- League: NBL

Personal information
- Born: January 8, 2001 (age 25) Chicago, Illinois, U.S.
- Listed height: 6 ft 6 in (1.98 m)
- Listed weight: 210 lb (95 kg)

Career information
- High school: Eric Solorio Academy (Chicago, Illinois); Roselle Catholic (Roselle, New Jersey)
- College: Kentucky (2019–2020)
- NBA draft: 2020: undrafted
- Playing career: 2021–present

Career history
- 2021: Greensboro Swarm
- 2021–2022: Rio Grande Valley Vipers
- 2022: Newfoundland Growlers
- 2022–2023: Rio Grande Valley Vipers
- 2023: Indios de San Francisco
- 2023: Freseros de Irapuato
- 2023: Windy City Bulls
- 2024: KK Škrljevo
- 2024: Manawatu Jets
- 2025: Frayles de Guasave
- 2025–present: Suke Lions

Career highlights
- NBA G League champion (2022); McDonald's All-American (2019)
- Stats at NBA.com
- Stats at Basketball Reference

Kahlil Whitney (born January 8, 2001) is an American professional basketball player for the Suke Lions of the National Basketball League (NBL). He played college basketball for the Kentucky Wildcats.

== High school career ==
Whitney attended Eric Solorio Academy High School for his freshman year. Following his freshman year, Whitney transferred to Roselle Catholic High School in Roselle, New Jersey for the remainder of his high school career. As a senior, Whitney averaged 19.4 points, 5.7 rebounds, 1.8 assists and 1.1 steals per game and led Roselle Catholic to a 28–4 record. He was named a McDonald's All-American and was named co-MVP of the Iverson Classic after scoring a game-high 38 points.

=== Recruiting ===
On August 10, 2018, Whitney committed to play at the University of Kentucky.

College recruiting
Name	Hometown	School	Height	Weight	Commit date
Kahlil Whitney; SF	Chicago, IL	Roselle Catholic (NJ)	6 ft 7 in (2.01 m)	200 lb (91 kg)	Aug 10, 2018
Kahlil Whitney; SF	Recruit ratings: Rivals: 247Sports: ESPN: (95)				
Overall recruit ranking: Rivals: 14 247Sports: 11 ESPN: 12
Note: In many cases, Scout, Rivals, 247Sports, On3, and ESPN may conflict in their listings of height and weight.; In these cases, the average was taken. ESPN grades are on a 100-point scale.; Sources: "Kentucky 2019 Basketball Commitments". Rivals.; "2019 Kentucky Wildcats Recruiting Class". ESPN.; "2019 Team Ranking". Rivals.

== College career ==
In his second game at Kentucky, a 91–49 win over Eastern Kentucky, Whitney scored 11 points. He averaged 3.3 points and 1.7 rebounds per game at Kentucky. On January 24, 2020, in the middle of his freshman season, Whitney announced that he would be leaving the University of Kentucky. Whitney declared for the 2020 NBA draft and hired an agent.

== Professional career ==
=== Greensboro Swarm (2021) ===
After going undrafted in the 2020 NBA draft, Whitney signed an Exhibit 10 deal with the Charlotte Hornets. He was waived at the end of training camp and added to the roster of the Hornets' NBA G League affiliate, the Greensboro Swarm. Whitney averaged 3.0 points and 1.3 rebounds per game for the Swarm in the G League hub season between February and March 2021.

=== Rio Grande Valley Vipers (2021–2022) ===
In October 2021, Whitney joined the Rio Grande Valley Vipers for the 2021–22 NBA G League season.

=== Newfoundland Growlers (2022) ===
On April 21, 2022, Whitney signed with the Newfoundland Growlers of the CEBL.

=== Return to Rio Grande Valley (2022–2023) ===
In November 2022, Whitney re-joined the Rio Grande Valley Vipers for the 2022–23 NBA G League season. He was waived on January 28, 2023.

=== Indios de San Francisco (2023) ===
In May 2023, Whitney had a four-game stint with Indios de San Francisco of the Liga Nacional de Baloncesto.

=== Freseros de Irapuato (2023) ===
In September 2023, Whitney joined the Freseros de Irapuato of the Liga Nacional de Baloncesto Profesional (LNBP) in Mexico. He recorded 15 points in his team debut, a loss to the Halcones Rojos Veracruz.

=== Windy City Bulls (2023) ===
On October 16, 2023, Whitney signed with the Chicago Bulls, but was waived just two days later. On November 9, he joined the Windy City Bulls, but was waived on December 19.

=== KK Škrljevo (2024) ===
In February 2024, Whitney joined KK Škrljevo for the rest of the 2023–24 Croatian League season.

=== Manawatu Jets (2024) ===
On May 23, 2024, Whitney signed with the Manawatu Jets of the New Zealand National Basketball League (NZNBL) for the rest of the 2024 season.

== Career statistics ==
Legend
GP	Games played	GS	Games started	MPG	Minutes per game
FG%	Field goal percentage	3P%	3-point field goal percentage	FT%	Free throw percentage
RPG	Rebounds per game	APG	Assists per game	SPG	Steals per game
BPG	Blocks per game	PPG	Points per game	**Bold**	Career high

=== College ===
Year	Team	GP	GS	MPG	FG%	3P%	FT%	RPG	APG	SPG	BPG	PPG
2019–20	Kentucky	18	8	12.8	.371	.250	.435	1.7	.4	.3	.2	3.3
