= 2019–20 Kentucky Wildcats men's basketball team =

2019–20 season of University of Kentucky men's basketball team

2019–20 Kentucky Wildcats men's basketball

SEC regular season champions
- Conference: Southeastern Conference

Ranking
- Coaches: No. 7
- AP: No. 8
- Record: 25–6 (15–3 SEC)
- Head coach: John Calipari (11th season)
- Assistant coaches: Kenny Payne (10th season); Tony Barbee (6th season); Joel Justus (4th season)
- Home arena: Rupp Arena

2019–20 Southeastern Conference men's basketball standings
	Conf.				Overall
Team	W		L	PCT	W		L	PCT
No. 8 Kentucky	15	–	3	.833	25	–	6	.806
No. 20 Auburn	12	–	6	.667	25	–	6	.806
LSU	12	–	6	.667	21	–	10	.677
Mississippi State	11	–	7	.611	20	–	11	.645
Florida	11	–	7	.611	19	–	12	.613
South Carolina	10	–	8	.556	18	–	13	.581
Texas A&M	10	–	8	.556	16	–	14	.533
Tennessee	9	–	9	.500	17	–	14	.548
Alabama	8	–	10	.444	16	–	15	.516
Arkansas	7	–	11	.389	20	–	12	.625
Missouri	7	–	11	.389	15	–	16	.484
Ole Miss	6	–	12	.333	15	–	17	.469
Georgia	5	–	13	.278	16	–	16	.500
Vanderbilt	3	–	15	.167	11	–	21	.344
Note: The 2020 SEC tournament was canceled after the first round due to the COVID-19 pandemic. Rankings from AP poll

The 2019–20 Kentucky Wildcats men's basketball team represented the University of Kentucky in the 2019–20 NCAA Division I men's basketball season. The team played its home games in Lexington, Kentucky for the 44th consecutive season at Rupp Arena, with a capacity of 20,545. The Wildcats were led by John Calipari in his 11th season as head coach and played in the Southeastern Conference. They finished the season 25–6, 15–3 in SEC play to win the SEC regular season championship. They were set to be the No. 1 seed in the SEC tournament with a bye to the quarterfinals. However, the SEC Tournament was cancelled amid the COVID-19 pandemic. With the SEC Tournament cancelled, they were awarded the SEC's automatic bid to the NCAA tournament. However, the NCAA Tournament was also cancelled due to the COVID-19 pandemic.

Officially, the Wildcats finished No. 7 in the Coaches' Poll and No. 8 in the AP Poll.

== Previous season ==
The Wildcats finished the 2018–19 season 30–7, 15–3 in SEC play to finish in a tie for second. In the SEC tournament, the Wildcats defeated Alabama, but were defeated by Tennessee in the semi-finals of the tournament. The Wildcats received an at-large bid NCAA tournament. As the No. 2 seed in the Midwest Region, they defeated No. 15 Abilene Christian, No. 7 Wofford, and No. 3 Houston to advance to the Elite Eight. There, they lost to the No. 5-seed Auburn.

== Offseason ==
=== Departures ===
On April 9, 2019, P. J. Washington announced that he would be entering the 2019 NBA Draft and would sign with an agent. However, due to changes in NCAA rules that took effect with the 2019 draft, signing with an agent no longer automatically results in loss of NCAA eligibility. On April 16, Tyler Herro announced that he would remain in the NBA draft, forgoing his remaining eligibility. The following day, two more players announced their departures, with Keldon Johnson announcing he would leave Kentucky and stay in the 2019 NBA draft and Jemarl Baker announcing his intention to transfer from Kentucky.

Name	Number	Pos.	Height	Weight	Year	Hometown	Reason left
Reid Travis	22	Forward	6'8"	245	Senior	Minneapolis, Minnesota	Completed athletic eligibility; graduated from Stanford in 2018
Jonny David	10	Guard	6'2"	183	Senior	Pittsburgh, Pennsylvania	Graduated
P. J. Washington	25	Forward	6'7"	236	Sophomore	Dallas, Texas	Declared for the 2019 NBA draft
Tyler Herro	14	Guard	6'5"	195	Freshman	Milwaukee, Wisconsin	Declared for the 2019 NBA draft
Keldon Johnson	3	Forward	6'6"	210	Freshman	South Hill, Virginia	Declared for the 2019 NBA draft
Jemarl Baker	13	Guard	6'4"	185	RS Freshman	Eastvale, California	Transferred to Arizona
Brad Calipari	12	Guard	6'0"	176	Junior	Franklin Lakes, New Jersey	Graduate transferred to Detroit Mercy

=== 2019 recruiting class ===
In May Kentucky announced the completion of its 2019 signing class. It ranked as a consensus top-three class for the eleventh straight season under Calipari. The 2019 class consists of forward Dontaie Allen (Falmouth, KY), forward Keion Brooks Jr. (Fort Wayne, IN), guard Johnny Juzang (Studio City, CA), guard Tyrese Maxey (Garland, TX), and forward Kahlil Whitney (Chicago).

On May 9, 2018, Maxey committed to become the first member of the class. He chose Kentucky over offers from Michigan State and Texas. Maxey was ranked as the consensus #2 ranked point guard in the 2019 class, and became a McDonald's All-American.

On August 2, 2018, Allen committed to Kentucky over offers from Florida and Louisville. On March 5, 2019, Allen was named Kentucky Mr. Basketball.

On August 8, 2018, Kahlil Whitney committed to play basketball for UK over offers from Illinois and Georgetown. Whitney is the third commitment to commit in the 2019 class and is ranked #19 overall in the 2019 class by 247 sports.

On March 15, 2019, Keion Brooks Jr., from Fort Wayne, IN, committed to play basketball for Kentucky over offers from Michigan State and Indiana. Brooks is the fourth recruit to commit in the 2019 class and is ranked #23 overall in the 2019 by 247 sports.

On May 10, 2019, Johnny Juzang committed to play basketball for Kentucky over an offer to play for Virginia. Juzang is the fifth commitment to commit in the 2019 class and is ranked #32 overall in the 2019 class by 247 sports.

College recruiting information
Name	Hometown	School	Height	Weight	Commit date
Tyrese Maxey; PG	Garland, TX	South Garland High School	6 ft 3 in (1.91 m)	185 lb (84 kg)	May 9, 2018
Tyrese Maxey; PG	Recruit ratings: Scout: Rivals: 247Sports: ESPN: (93)				
Dontaie Allen; SF	Falmouth, KY	Pendleton County High School	6 ft 6 in (1.98 m)	200 lb (91 kg)	Aug 2, 2018
Dontaie Allen; SF	Recruit ratings: Scout: Rivals: 247Sports: ESPN: (78)				
Kahlil Whitney; SF	Roselle, NJ	Roselle Catholic High School	6 ft 6 in (1.98 m)	190 lb (86 kg)	Aug 8, 2018
Kahlil Whitney; SF	Recruit ratings: Scout: Rivals: 247Sports: ESPN: (94)				
Keion Brooks Jr. SF	Fort Wayne, IN	La Lumiere	6 ft 7 in (2.01 m)	185 lb (84 kg)	Mar 15, 2019
Keion Brooks Jr. SF	Recruit ratings: Scout: Rivals: 247Sports: ESPN: (89)				
Johnny Juzang; SF	Studio City, CA	Harvard-Westlake School	6 ft 7 in (2.01 m)	200 lb (91 kg)	May 10, 2019
Johnny Juzang; SF	Recruit ratings: Scout: Rivals: 247Sports: ESPN: (89)				
Overall recruit ranking: Scout: #2 Rivals: #2 247Sports: #2 ESPN: #4
Note: In many cases, Scout, Rivals, 247Sports, On3, and ESPN may conflict in their listings of height and weight.; In these cases, the average was taken. ESPN grades are on a 100-point scale.; Sources: "Kentucky 2019 Basketball Commitments". Rivals.; "2019 Kentucky Basketball Commits". Scout.; "Scout.com Team Recruiting Rankings". Scout.; "2019 Team Ranking". Rivals.

=== Incoming transfers ===
On April 4, 2019, Nate Sestina announced that he would transfer to Kentucky for the 2019–2020 season. Sestina was named second team All-Patriot league for Bucknell and averaged 15.8 PPG and 8.7 RPG in his final year with the Bisons. As a grad transfer, he is eligible to play immediately under NCAA rules.

Name	Number	Pos.	Height	Weight	Year	Hometown	Previous School
Nate Sestina	4	F	6'9"	245	Graduate Student	Emporium, PA	Bucknell

=== 2020 recruiting class ===
On July 27, 2019, Brandon Boston Jr. committed to play basketball for the University of Kentucky over offers from Florida and Duke. Boston is the first commitment to the 2020 recruiting class and the #2 ranked shooting guard in the 2020 class by 247 sports.

Cam'Ron Fletcher, from St. Louis, Missouri, is the second commitment in the Kentucky 2020 recruiting class. He committed to Kentucky on August 4, 2019, and chose Kentucky over Michigan State. He is a consensus four-star player by the four main recruiting services and is ranked #36 overall by 24/7 Sports.

Power forward Lance Ware, from Camden, New Jersey, is the third commitment in the Kentucky 2020 recruiting class. He committed to Kentucky on September 12, 2019, and chose Kentucky over Ohio State. He is a consensus four-star player by the four main recruiting services and is ranked #32 overall by Rivals.

Two days later, on September 14, 2019, SF Terrence Clarke from Brewster Academy pledged to Kentucky. Clarke is one of the most highly regarded prospects in the 2020 class, with most services ranking him among the top five players overall.

College recruiting information (2020)
Name	Hometown	School	Height	Weight	Commit date
Brandon Boston Jr. SG	Chatsworth, CA	Sierra Canyon School	6 ft 6 in (1.98 m)	175 lb (79 kg)	Jul 27, 2019
Brandon Boston Jr. SG	Recruit ratings: Scout: Rivals: 247Sports: ESPN: (96)				
Cam'Ron Fletcher; SF	St. Louis, MO	Vashon High School	6 ft 6 in (1.98 m)	180 lb (82 kg)	Aug 4, 2019
Cam'Ron Fletcher; SF	Recruit ratings: Scout: Rivals: 247Sports: ESPN: (83)				
Lance Ware; PF	Camden, NJ	Big Picture Learning Academy	6 ft 9 in (2.06 m)	205 lb (93 kg)	Sep 12, 2019
Lance Ware; PF	Recruit ratings: Scout: Rivals: 247Sports: ESPN: (87)				
Terrence Clarke; SF	Wolfeboro, NH	Brewster Academy	6 ft 7 in (2.01 m)	190 lb (86 kg)	Sep 14, 2019
Terrence Clarke; SF	Recruit ratings: Scout: Rivals: 247Sports: ESPN: (95)				
Devin Askew; PG	Santa Ana, CA	Mater Dei High School	6 ft 3 in (1.91 m)	195 lb (88 kg)	Oct 17, 2019
Devin Askew; PG	Recruit ratings: Scout: Rivals: 247Sports: ESPN: (91)				
Isaiah Jackson; PF	Waterford, MI	Waterford Mott High School	6 ft 8 in (2.03 m)	200 lb (91 kg)	Nov 16, 2019
Isaiah Jackson; PF	Recruit ratings: Scout: Rivals: 247Sports: ESPN: (89)				
Overall recruit ranking: Rivals: 1st 247Sports: 1st ESPN: 1st
Note: In many cases, Scout, Rivals, 247Sports, On3, and ESPN may conflict in their listings of height and weight.; In these cases, the average was taken. ESPN grades are on a 100-point scale.; Sources: "Kentucky 2020 Basketball Commitments". Rivals.; "2020 Team Ranking". Rivals.

=== Other news ===
As part of a major renovation of Rupp Arena, included within a larger expansion project for the attached Central Bank Center convention complex, nearly half of the upper arena bowl, originally consisting entirely of bleacher seating, was refitted with chairback seats during the 2019 offseason. This reduced the arena's basketball capacity by nearly 3,000—from 23,500 to 20,545.

On January 27, 2020, it was announced that Lexington Center's overall naming rights were sold to Central Bank, a local community bank, by the Lexington Center Corporation and JMI Sports, which handles the multimedia rights for both the LCC and the University of Kentucky. The Rupp name will continue to receive primacy in the fourteen-year agreement for the arena portion of the complex, and be known as "Rupp Arena at Central Bank Center".

== Roster ==
2019–20 Kentucky Wildcats men's basketball team
Players
Coaches

Pos.	#	Name	Height	Weight	Year	Previous school	Hometown
G	0	Ashton Hagans	6 ft 3 in (1.91 m)	198 lb (90 kg)	So	Newton	Cartersville, GA
F	1	Nate Sestina	6 ft 9 in (2.06 m)	234 lb (106 kg)	GS	Bucknell	Emporium, PA
G	3	Tyrese Maxey	6 ft 3 in (1.91 m)	198 lb (90 kg)	Fr	South Garland	Garland, TX
C	4	Nick Richards	6 ft 11 in (2.11 m)	247 lb (112 kg)	Jr	The Patrick School	Kingston, Jamaica
G	5	Immanuel Quickley	6 ft 3 in (1.91 m)	188 lb (85 kg)	So	The John Carroll School	Havre de Grace, MD
G	10	Johnny Juzang	6 ft 6 in (1.98 m)	214 lb (97 kg)	Fr	Harvard-Westlake School	Los Angeles, CA
G	11	Dontaie Allen (injured)	6 ft 6 in (1.98 m)	200 lb (91 kg)	Fr	Pendleton County	Falmouth, KY
F	12	Keion Brooks Jr.	6 ft 7 in (2.01 m)	205 lb (93 kg)	Fr	La Lumiere School	Fort Wayne, IN
G	13	Riley Welch	6 ft 0 in (1.83 m)	185 lb (84 kg)	Jr	UC Irvine	Littleton, CO
F	14	Brennan Canada (W)	6 ft 6 in (1.98 m)	198 lb (90 kg)	Fr	George Rogers Clark	Mount Sterling, KY
G/F	21	Zan Payne (W)	6 ft 4 in (1.93 m)	235 lb (107 kg)	RS Fr	Lexington Catholic	Lexington, KY
F	23	E. J. Montgomery	6 ft 10 in (2.08 m)	228 lb (103 kg)	So	Wheeler	Fort Pierce, FL
F	33	Ben Jordan	6 ft 9 in (2.06 m)	250 lb (113 kg)	RS So	West Carter	Olive Hill, KY

Head coach

- John Calipari (Clarion)

Assistant coach(es)

- Kenny Payne (Louisville)
- Tony Barbee (UMass)
- Joel Justus (UNC Wilmington)
- John Robic (Denison)

Legend

- (C) Team captain
- (S) Suspended
- (I) Ineligible
- (W) Walk-on
- Injured
- Current redshirt

Roster
Last update: October 22, 2019

== Depth chart ==
Pos.	Starting 5	Bench 1	Bench 2
C	Nick Richards	Nate Sestina	Ben Jordan
PF	E. J. Montgomery	Keion Brooks Jr.	Brennan Canada
SF	Immanuel Quickley	Dontaie Allen	Zan Payne
SG	Tyrese Maxey	Johnny Juzang
PG	Ashton Hagans	Riley Welch

== Schedule and results ==
Date time, TV	Rank^{#}	Opponent^{#}	Result	Record	High points	High rebounds	High assists	Site (attendance) city, state
Exhibition
October 27, 2019*; 5:00 pm, SECN	No. 2	Georgetown (KY)	W 80–53	–	16 – Quickley	10 – Sestina	10 – Hagans	Rupp Arena (19,527); Lexington, KY
November 1, 2019*; 7:00 pm, SECN	No. 2	Kentucky State	W 83–51	–	15 – Tied	9 – Brooks Jr.	9 – Hagans	Rupp Arena (19,588); Lexington, KY
Regular season
November 5, 2019*; 9:30 pm, ESPN	No. 2	vs. No. 1 Michigan State; Champions Classic	W 69–62	1–0	26 – Maxey	6 – Sestina	3 – Hagans	Madison Square Garden (19,812); New York, NY
November 8, 2019*; 7:00 pm, SECN	No. 2	Eastern Kentucky	W 91–49	2–0	21 – Richards	11 – Sestina	5 – Tied	Rupp Arena (20,163); Lexington, KY
November 12, 2019*; 7:00 pm, SECN	No. 1	Evansville	L 64–67	2–1	16 – Quickley	9 – Quickley	3 – Hagans	Rupp Arena (19,101); Lexington, KY
November 18, 2019*; 7:00 pm, ESPN2	No. 9	Utah Valley; BBN Showcase	W 82–74	3–1	26 – Hagans	12 – Sestina	5 – Hagans	Rupp Arena (18,859); Lexington, KY
November 22, 2019*; 7:00 pm, SECN	No. 9	Mount St. Mary's; BBN Showcase	W 82–62	4–1	19 – Richards	7 – Hagans	7 – Hagans	Rupp Arena (20,351); Lexington, KY
November 24, 2019*; 6:00 pm, SECN	No. 9	Lamar; BBN Showcase	W 81–56	5–1	21 – Maxey	13 – Richards	9 – Hagans	Rupp Arena (20,048); Lexington, KY
November 29, 2019*; 7:00 pm, SECN	No. 9	UAB; BBN Showcase	W 69–58	6–1	16 – Tied	9 – Richards	12 – Hagans	Rupp Arena (20,401); Lexington, KY
December 7, 2019*; 4:00 pm, SECN	No. 8	Fairleigh Dickinson	W 83–52	7–1	25 – Montgomery	10 – Richards	11 – Hagans	Rupp Arena (20,080); Lexington, KY
December 14, 2019*; 5:00 pm, ESPN	No. 8	Georgia Tech	W 67–53	8–1	21 – Hagans	7 – Tied	7 – Hagans	Rupp Arena (20,111); Lexington, KY
December 18, 2019*; 11:00 pm, ESPN2	No. 6	vs. Utah; Neon Hoops Showcase	L 66–69	8–2	18 – Maxey	10 – Montgomery	8 – Hagans	T-Mobile Arena (5,507); Paradise, NV
December 21, 2019*; 5:15 pm, CBS	No. 6	vs. No. 5 Ohio State; CBS Sports Classic	L 65–71	8–3	15 – Maxey	6 – Maxey	9 – Hagans	T-Mobile Arena; Paradise, NV
December 28, 2019*; 3:45 pm, CBS	No. 19	No. 3 Louisville; Battle for the Bluegrass	W 78–70 ^{OT}	9–3	27 – Maxey	10 – Richards	8 – Hagans	Rupp Arena (20,437); Lexington, KY
January 4, 2020; 2:00 pm, SECN	No. 17	Missouri	W 71–59	10–3 (1–0)	23 – Quickley	12 – Richards	7 – Hagans	Rupp Arena (20,396); Lexington, KY
January 7, 2020; 9:00 pm, ESPN	No. 14	at Georgia	W 78–69	11–3 (2–0)	17 – Tied	7 – Tied	8 – Maxey	Stegeman Coliseum (10,523); Athens, GA
January 11, 2020; 12:00 pm, ESPN	No. 14	Alabama	W 76–67	12–3 (3–0)	19 – Quickley	11 – Richards	9 – Hagans	Rupp Arena (20,407); Lexington, KY
January 15, 2020; 6:30 pm, SECN	No. 10	at South Carolina	L 78–81	12–4 (3–1)	20 – Quickley	7 – Tied	7 – Hagans	Colonial Life Arena (18,000); Columbia, SC
January 18, 2020; 4:00 pm, ESPN	No. 10	at Arkansas	W 73–66	13–4 (4–1)	17 – Richards	10 – Quickley	6 – Hagans	Bud Walton Arena (19,200); Fayetteville, AR
January 21, 2020; 7:00 pm, ESPN	No. 15	Georgia	W 89–79	14–4 (5–1)	23 – Hagans	8 – Richards	9 – Hagans	Rupp Arena (20,135); Lexington, KY
January 25, 2020*; 6:00 pm, ESPN	No. 15	at No. 18 Texas Tech; Big 12/SEC Challenge	W 76–74 ^{OT}	15–4	25 – Richards	14 – Richards	7 – Hagans	United Supermarkets Arena (14,763); Lubbock, TX
January 29, 2020; 6:30 pm, SECN	No. 13	Vanderbilt	W 71–62	16–4 (6–1)	17 – Maxey	11 – Richards	6 – Hagans	Rupp Arena (20,311); Lexington, KY
February 1, 2020; 6:00 pm, ESPN	No. 13	at No. 17 Auburn; ESPN College GameDay	L 66–75	16–5 (6–2)	23 – Quickley	7 – Richards	3 – Hagans	Auburn Arena (9,121); Auburn, AL
February 4, 2020; 9:00 pm, ESPN	No. 15	Mississippi State	W 80–72	17–5 (7–2)	27 – Richards	11 – Richards	6 – Hagans	Rupp Arena (20,115); Lexington, KY
February 8, 2020; 1:00 pm, CBS	No. 15	at Tennessee; Rivalry	W 77–64	18–5 (8–2)	18 – Quickley	9 – Brooks Jr.	4 – Maxey	Thompson–Boling Arena (21,232); Knoxville, TN
February 11, 2020; 7:00 pm, ESPN	No. 12	at Vanderbilt	W 78–64	19–5 (9–2)	25 – Maxey	10 – Hagans	8 – Hagans	Memorial Gymnasium (11,598); Nashville, TN
February 15, 2020; 2:00 pm, ESPN	No. 12	Ole Miss	W 67–62	20–5 (10–2)	17 – Quickley	8 – Montgomery	3 – Maxey	Rupp Arena (20,417); Lexington, KY
February 18, 2020; 9:00 pm, ESPN	No. 10	at LSU	W 79–76	21–5 (11–2)	21 – Quickley	8 – Sestina	6 – Quickley	Pete Maravich Assembly Center (13,260); Baton Rouge, LA
February 22, 2020; 6:00 pm, ESPN	No. 10	Florida; Rivalry	W 65–59	22–5 (12–2)	26 – Quickley	7 – Maxey	7 – Maxey	Rupp Arena (20,489); Lexington, KY
February 25, 2020; 7:00 pm, ESPN	No. 8	at Texas A&M	W 69–60	23–5 (13–2)	30 – Quickley	10 – Montgomery	7 – Hagans	Reed Arena (8,190); College Station, TX
February 29, 2020; 3:45 pm, CBS	No. 8	No. 15 Auburn	W 73–66	24–5 (14–2)	18 – Quickley	12 – Quickley	5 – Hagans	Rupp Arena (20,638); Lexington, KY
March 3, 2020; 9:00 pm, ESPN	No. 6	Tennessee; Rivalry	L 73–81	24–6 (14–3)	21 – Maxey	9 – Richards	4 – Hagans	Rupp Arena (20,413); Lexington, KY
March 7, 2020; 1:00 pm, CBS	No. 6	at Florida; Rivalry	W 71–70	25–6 (15–3)	21 – Richards	7 – Richards	7 – Maxey	O'Connell Center (9,767); Gainesville, FL
SEC tournament
March 13, 2020; 1:00 pm, ESPN	(1) No. 8	vs. Quarterfinals	Cancelled due to the COVID-19 pandemic					Bridgestone Arena; Nashville, TN
*Non-conference game. ^{#}Rankings from AP Poll. (#) Tournament seedings in parentheses. All times are in Eastern Time.

=== SEC tournament ===
The Wildcats received the No. 1 seed in the SEC tournament. However, the 2020 SEC Men's Basketball Tournament was cancelled before the Wildcats played their first game, due to the COVID-19 pandemic. Kentucky was officially the league champion by SEC rule.

=== 2020 NCAA men's basketball tournament ===
Like the SEC Tournament, the NCAA tournament was cancelled amidst concern over the health of participants as a result of the COVID-19 outbreak in the United States.

== Rankings ==
Ranking movements Legend: ██ Increase in ranking ██ Decrease in ranking ( ) = First-place votes
	Week																			
Poll	Pre	1	2	3	4	5	6	7	8	9	10	11	12	13	14	15	16	17	18	Final
AP	2 (2)	1 (64)	9	9	8	8	6	19	17	14	10	15	13	15	12	10	8	6	8	8
Coaches	2	2*	10	11	10	9	6	19	14	13	12	14	13	16	12	10	9	6	7	7

*AP does not release post-NCAA Tournament rankings
