= 2019–20 Ole Miss Rebels men's basketball team =

American college basketball season

2019–20 Ole Miss Rebels men's basketball
- Conference: Southeastern Conference
- Record: 15–17 (6–12 SEC)
- Head coach: Kermit Davis (2nd season)
- Assistant coaches: Win Case; Ronnie Hamilton; Levi Watkins
- Home arena: The Pavilion at Ole Miss

2019–20 Southeastern Conference men's basketball standings
	Conf.				Overall
Team	W		L	PCT	W		L	PCT
No. 8 Kentucky	15	–	3	.833	25	–	6	.806
No. 20 Auburn	12	–	6	.667	25	–	6	.806
LSU	12	–	6	.667	21	–	10	.677
Mississippi State	11	–	7	.611	20	–	11	.645
Florida	11	–	7	.611	19	–	12	.613
South Carolina	10	–	8	.556	18	–	13	.581
Texas A&M	10	–	8	.556	16	–	14	.533
Tennessee	9	–	9	.500	17	–	14	.548
Alabama	8	–	10	.444	16	–	15	.516
Arkansas	7	–	11	.389	20	–	12	.625
Missouri	7	–	11	.389	15	–	16	.484
Ole Miss	6	–	12	.333	15	–	17	.469
Georgia	5	–	13	.278	16	–	16	.500
Vanderbilt	3	–	15	.167	11	–	21	.344
Note: The 2020 SEC tournament was canceled after the first round due to the COVID-19 pandemic. Rankings from AP poll

The 2019–20 Ole Miss Rebels men's basketball team represented the University of Mississippi in the 2019–20 NCAA Division I men's basketball season, their 110th basketball season. The Rebels were led by second-year head coach, Kermit Davis. The Rebels played their games at The Pavilion at Ole Miss in Oxford, Mississippi as members of the Southeastern Conference. They finished the season 15–17, 6–12 in SEC play to finish in 12th place. They lost in the first round of the 2020 SEC tournament to Georgia.

== Previous season ==
The Rebels finished the 2018–19 season 20–13, 10–8 in SEC play to finish in a tie for sixth place. They lost in the first round of the NCAA tournament to Oklahoma, their first appearance since 2015.

== Offseason ==
=== Departures ===
Name	Number	Pos.	Height	Weight	Year	Hometown	Reason for departure
Zach Naylor	1	F	6'8"	220	Junior	Houston, TX	Transferred to Tarleton State
Terence Davis	3	G	6'4"	205	Senior	Southaven, MS	Graduated
Brian Halums	5	G	6'5"	188	Junior	Hollandale, MS	Transferred to Arkansas–Fort Smith
Bruce Stevens	12	F	6'8"	252	Senior	Louin, MS	Graduated
Dominik Olejniczak	13	C	7'0"	260	RS Junior	Toruń, Poland	Graduate Transfer to Florida State
D.C. Davis	20	G	5'11"	185	Senior	Purvis, MS	Graduated

=== Incoming transfers ===
Name	Number	Pos.	Height	Weight	Year	Hometown	Previous School
Jarkel Joiner	24	G	6'1"	177	Junior	Oxford, MS	Cal State Bakersfield; will redshirt in 2019–20 due to transfer rules.
Khadim Sy	3	F	6'10"	244	RS Junior	Dakar, Senegal	Daytona State College
Bryce Williams	13	G	6'2"	178	Junior	Tampa, FL	Daytona State College

=== 2019 recruiting class ===
College recruiting information
Name	Hometown	School	Height	Weight	Commit date
Austin Crowley #18 SG	West Point, MS	Sunrise Christian Academy (KS)	6 ft 6 in (1.98 m)	185 lb (84 kg)	Apr 12, 2019
Austin Crowley #18 SG	Recruit ratings: Scout: Rivals: 247Sports: ESPN:				
Shon Robinson; PF	Chicago, IL	Eduprize School (AZ)	6 ft 10 in (2.08 m)	210 lb (95 kg)	Aug 21, 2019
Shon Robinson; PF	Recruit ratings: Scout: Rivals: 247Sports: ESPN:				
Antavion Collum; SF	Memphis, TN	Tennessee Preparatory Academy	6 ft 7 in (2.01 m)	215 lb (98 kg)	Sep 25, 2018
Antavion Collum; SF	Recruit ratings: Scout: Rivals: 247Sports: ESPN:				
Sammy Hunter; PF	Nassau, Bahamas	British Columbia Christian Academy (Canada)	6 ft 9 in (2.06 m)	225 lb (102 kg)	Oct 20, 2018
Sammy Hunter; PF	Recruit ratings: Scout: Rivals: 247Sports: ESPN:				
Overall recruit ranking:
Note: In many cases, Scout, Rivals, 247Sports, On3, and ESPN may conflict in their listings of height and weight.; In these cases, the average was taken. ESPN grades are on a 100-point scale.; Sources: "Ole Miss 2019 Basketball Commitments". Rivals.; "2019 Team Ranking". Rivals.

== Preseason ==
=== SEC media poll ===
The SEC media poll was released on October 15, 2019.

Media poll
Predicted finish	Team
1	Kentucky
2	Florida
3	LSU
4	Auburn
5	Tennessee
6	Alabama
7	Mississippi State
8	Ole Miss
9	Georgia
10	South Carolina
11	Arkansas
12	Texas A&M
13	Missouri
14	Vanderbilt

=== Preseason All-SEC teams ===
The Rebels had one player selected to the preseason all-SEC teams.

First Team

Breein Tyree

== Roster ==
2019–20 Ole Miss Rebels men's basketball team
Players
Coaches

Pos.	#	Name	Height	Weight	Year	Previous school	Hometown
G/F	0	Blake Hinson	6 ft 7 in (2.01 m)	229 lb (104 kg)	So	Sunrise Christian Academy	Deltona, FL
G	1	Austin Crowley	6 ft 5 in (1.96 m)	188 lb (85 kg)	Fr	Sunrise Christian Academy	West Point, MS
G	2	Devontae Shuler	6 ft 2 in (1.88 m)	192 lb (87 kg)	Jr	Oak Hill Academy	Irmo, SC
F	3	Khadim Sy	6 ft 10 in (2.08 m)	244 lb (111 kg)	Jr	Oak Hill Academy; Daytona State College	Dakar, Senegal
G	4	Breein Tyree	6 ft 2 in (1.88 m)	195 lb (88 kg)	Sr	St. Joseph HS	Somerset, NJ
F	5	KJ Buffen	6 ft 7 in (2.01 m)	220 lb (100 kg)	So	Gainesville HS	Gainesville, GA
F	10	Carlos Curry	6 ft 11 in (2.11 m)	235 lb (107 kg)	RS Fr	Dougherty Comprehensive HS	Albany, GA
G	11	Franco Miller Jr.	6 ft 2 in (1.88 m)	202 lb (92 kg)	RS Fr	Crestwood Prep	Freeport, Bahamas
F	12	Shon Robinson (redshirt)	6 ft 11 in (2.11 m)	210 lb (95 kg)	Fr	Eduprize (Ariz.)	Chicago, IL
G	13	Bryce Williams	6 ft 2 in (1.88 m)	178 lb (81 kg)	Jr	South Sumter HS; Daytona State College	Tampa, FL
F	14	Antavion Collum	6 ft 7 in (2.01 m)	228 lb (103 kg)	Fr	Tennessee Preparatory Academy	Memphis, TN
G/F	15	Luis Rodriguez (injured)	6 ft 6 in (1.98 m)	202 lb (92 kg)	So	Woodstock Academy	Los Angeles, CA
F	23	Sammy Hunter	6 ft 9 in (2.06 m)	230 lb (104 kg)	Fr	British Columbia Christian Academy	Nassau, Bahamas
G	24	Jarkel Joiner (redshirt)	6 ft 1 in (1.85 m)	177 lb (80 kg)	Jr	Oxford HS; Cal State Bakersfield	Oxford, MS
G	33	John McBride (W)	6 ft 5 in (1.96 m)	216 lb (98 kg)	RS Fr	Memphis University School	Memphis, TN
G	34	Connor McKay (W)	5 ft 11 in (1.8 m)	182 lb (83 kg)	Jr	Baldwyn HS; Northeast Mississippi C.C.	Baldwyn, MS

Head coach

- Kermit Davis (Mississippi State)

Assistant coach(es)

- Win Case (Oklahoma City)
- Ronnie Hamilton (UNC Pembroke)
- Levi Watkins (NC State)

Legend

- (C) Team captain
- (S) Suspended
- (I) Ineligible
- (W) Walk-on
- Injured
- Current redshirt

Roster

== Schedule and results ==
Date time, TV	Rank^{#}	Opponent^{#}	Result	Record	High points	High rebounds	High assists	Site (attendance) city, state
Exhibition
November 4, 2019*; 6:30 pm		Mississippi College; Hurricane Dorian relief game	W 69–43		21 – Buffen	6 – Buffen, Shuler	3 – Crowley, Tyree, Williams	The Pavilion at Ole Miss; Oxford, MS
Non-conference regular season
November 8, 2019*; 6:00 pm, SECN+		Arkansas State	W 71–43	1–0	20 – Shuler	9 – Buffen	4 – Tyree	The Pavilion at Ole Miss (8,009); Oxford, MS
November 12, 2019*; 6:30 pm, SECN+		Norfolk State	W 68–55	2–0	23 – Buffen	9 – Buffen	5 – Shuler	The Pavilion at Ole Miss (6,412); Oxford, MS
November 15, 2019*; 6:00 pm, SECN+		Western Michigan; NIT Season Tip-Off campus site game	W 85–58	3–0	20 – Tyree	6 – Buffen, Rodriguez	3 – Shuler, Tyree	The Pavilion at Ole Miss (7,310); Oxford, MS
November 19, 2019*; 6:30 pm, SECN+		Seattle; NIT Season Tip-Off campus site game	W 65–52	4–0	13 – Buffen	8 – Buffen	5 – Tyree	The Pavilion at Ole Miss (6,316); Oxford, MS
November 23, 2019*; 12:00 pm, ESPN3		at No. 16 Memphis	L 86–87	4–1	24 – Tyree	6 – Buffen, Sy	6 – Crowley	FedExForum (17,875); Memphis, TN
November 27, 2019*; 4:00 pm, ESPN2		vs. Penn State; NIT Season Tip-Off semifinals	W 74–72	5–1	18 – Tyree	9 – Buffen	6 – Buffen	Barclays Center (4,114); Brooklyn, NY
November 29, 2019*; 8:30 pm, ESPN2		vs. Oklahoma State; NIT Season Tip-Off championship	L 37–78	5–2	7 – Collum, Tyree	7 – Shuler	5 – Shuler	Barclays Center (4,159); Brooklyn, NY
December 3, 2019*; 6:00 pm, SECN		No. 24 Butler	L 58–67	5–3	22 – Tyree	8 – Tyree	6 – Shuler	The Pavilion at Ole Miss (7,348); Oxford, MS
December 7, 2019*; 1:00 pm, SECN+		Cal State Bakersfield	W 83–67	6–3	23 – Hinson	7 – Sy	6 – Shuler, Tyree	The Pavilion at Ole Miss (6,276); Oxford, MS
December 14, 2019*; 2:00 pm, SECN		Middle Tennessee	W 82–64	7–3	34 – Tyree	8 – Buffen	9 – Shuler	The Pavilion at Ole Miss (7,734); Oxford, MS
December 21, 2019*; 1:00 pm, SECN+		vs. Southeastern Louisiana	W 83–76	8–3	20 – Sy	9 – Buffen	6 – Shuler	Mississippi Coliseum (2,042); Jackson, MS
December 29, 2019*; 3:00 pm, SECN+		Tennessee Tech	W 80–63	9–3	20 – Buffen, Shuler	10 – Hinson	5 – Crowley, Shuler	The Pavilion at Ole Miss (7,261); Oxford, MS
January 4, 2020*; 3:00 pm, ESPNU		at No. 24 Wichita State; American/SEC Alliance	L 54–74	9–4	12 – Shuler, Sy	5 – Shuler, Sy	2 – Shuler, Tyree	Charles Koch Arena (10,506); Wichita, KS
SEC regular season
January 7, 2020; 8:00 pm, SECN		at Texas A&M	L 47–57	9–5 (0–1)	26 – Tyree	6 – Miller Jr.	6 – Shuler	Reed Arena (5,982); College Station, TX
January 11, 2020; 5:00 pm, SECN		Arkansas	L 72–76	9–6 (0–2)	27 – Tyree	11 – Shuler	2 – Crowley, Shuler	The Pavilion at Ole Miss (8,233); Oxford, MS
January 14, 2020; 6:00 pm, ESPN2		at Florida	L 55–71	9–7 (0–3)	20 – Buffen	11 – Hinson	1 – Curry, Shuler, Williams	O'Connell Center (9,545); Gainesville, FL
January 18, 2020; 7:00 pm, ESPN2		LSU	L 76–80	9–8 (0–4)	36 – Tyree	6 – Sy	6 – Crowley	The Pavilion at Ole Miss (8,043); Oxford, MS
January 21, 2020; 8:00 pm, SECN		at Tennessee	L 48–73	9–9 (0–5)	18 – Tyree	6 – Buffen	3 – Buffen	Thompson–Boling Arena (17,031); Knoxville, TN
January 25, 2020; 4:30 pm, SECN		at Georgia	W 70–60	10–9 (1–5)	20 – Tyree	6 – Hinson, Shuler	4 – Tyree	Stegeman Coliseum (10,523); Athens, GA
January 28, 2020; 8:00 pm, ESPNU		No. 17 Auburn	L 82–83 ^{2OT}	10–10 (1–6)	26 – Shuler	7 – Sy	5 – Shuler	The Pavilion at Ole Miss (8,125); Oxford, MS
February 1, 2020; 11:00 am, ESPN2		at No. 22 LSU	L 63–73	10–11 (1–7)	28 – Shuler	7 – Shuler	3 – Crowley	Pete Maravich Assembly Center (11,112); Baton Rouge, LA
February 5, 2020; 6:00 pm, SECN		South Carolina	W 84–70	11–11 (2–7)	38 – Tyree	8 – Sy	4 – Shuler	The Pavilion at Ole Miss (6,990); Oxford, MS
February 8, 2020; 1:00 pm, ESPN2		Florida	W 68–51	12–11 (3–7)	23 – Tyree	9 – Buffen	5 – Shuler	The Pavilion at Ole Miss (7,760); Oxford, MS
February 11, 2020; 6:00 pm, ESPNU		Mississippi State	W 83–58	13–11 (4–7)	40 – Tyree	8 – Sy	4 – Tyree	The Pavilion at Ole Miss (8,009); Oxford, MS
February 15, 2020; 1:00 pm, ESPN		at No. 12 Kentucky	L 62–67	13–12 (4–8)	19 – Tyree	7 – Collum	2 – Hinson	Rupp Arena (20,417); Lexington, KY
February 18, 2020; 7:30 pm, SECN		at Missouri	L 68–71	13–13 (4–9)	29 – Tyree	8 – Buffen, Shuler	4 – Shuler	Mizzou Arena (8,677); Columbia, MO
February 22, 2020; 7:30 pm, SECN		Alabama	L 78–103	13–14 (4–10)	28 – Tyree	9 – Sy	4 – Tyree	The Pavilion at Ole Miss (8,393); Oxford, MS
February 25, 2020; 6:00 pm, SECN		at No. 15 Auburn	L 58–67	13–15 (4–11)	16 – Buffen, Tyree	8 – Buffen	2 – Crowley, Shuler	Auburn Arena (9,121); Auburn, AL
February 29, 2020; 12:00 pm, SECN		Vanderbilt	W 86–60	14–15 (5–11)	18 – Shuler	6 – Buffen, Sy	8 – Crowley	The Pavilion at Ole Miss (7,495); Oxford, MS
March 4, 2020; 8:00 pm, SECN		Missouri	W 75–67	15–15 (6–11)	19 – Hinson, Tyree	10 – Buffen	5 – Tyree	The Pavilion at Ole Miss (6,887); Oxford, MS
March 7, 2020; 5:30 pm, SECN		at Mississippi State	L 44–69	15–16 (6–12)	16 – Shuler	7 – Tyree	2 – Buffen, Crowley	Humphrey Coliseum (7,569); Starkville, MS
SEC tournament
March 11, 2020; 6:00 pm, SECN	(12)	vs. (13) Georgia; First round	L 63–81	15–17	18 – Tyree	8 – Buffen	2 – Shuler, Sy	Bridgestone Arena; Nashville, TN
*Non-conference game. ^{#}Rankings from AP Poll. (#) Tournament seedings in parentheses. All times are in Central Time.

== See also ==
- 2019–20 Ole Miss Rebels women's basketball team
