= 2020–21 Arkansas Razorbacks men's basketball team =

American college basketball season

2020–21 Arkansas Razorbacks men's basketball

NCAA tournament, Elite Eight
- Conference: Southeastern Conference

Ranking
- Coaches: No. 6
- AP: No. 10
- Record: 25–7 (13–4 SEC)
- Head coach: Eric Musselman (2nd season)
- Associate head coach: David Patrick (1st season)
- Assistant coaches: Corey Williams (2nd season); Clay Moser (2nd season)
- Home arena: Bud Walton Arena (Capacity: 19,368)

2020–21 Southeastern Conference men's basketball standings
	Conf.				Overall
Team	W		L	PCT	W		L	PCT
No. 5 Alabama†	16	–	2	.889	26	–	7	.788
No. 10 Arkansas	13	–	4	.765	25	–	7	.781
LSU	11	–	6	.647	19	–	10	.655
Tennessee	10	–	7	.588	18	–	9	.667
Florida	9	–	7	.563	15	–	10	.600
Ole Miss	10	–	8	.556	16	–	12	.571
Missouri	8	–	8	.500	16	–	10	.615
Kentucky	8	–	9	.471	9	–	16	.360
Mississippi State	8	–	10	.444	18	–	15	.545
Georgia	7	–	11	.389	14	–	12	.538
Auburn^{*}	7	–	11	.389	13	–	14	.481
South Carolina	4	–	12	.250	6	–	15	.286
Texas A&M	2	–	8	.200	8	–	10	.444
Vanderbilt	3	–	13	.188	9	–	16	.360
† 2021 SEC tournament winner^{*} Ineligible for postseason due to self-imposed postseason ban.

The 2020–21 Arkansas Razorbacks men's basketball team represented the University of Arkansas during the 2020–21 NCAA Division I men's basketball season. The team was led by second-year head coach Eric Musselman and played its home games at Bud Walton Arena in Fayetteville, Arkansas, as a member of the Southeastern Conference. The Razorbacks finished second in the SEC regular season and earned a 3 seed in the NCAA Tournament's South Regional. Arkansas went on to make it to the Sweet Sixteen of the NCAA Tournament for the first time since the 1995–96 season, and then to the Elite Eight for the first time since the 1994–95 season. Freshman guard Moses Moody was named the SEC Freshman of the Year, 1st Team All-SEC, Freshman All-American, and AP Honorable Mention All-American. The Razorbacks finished the season with an overall record of 25–7, 13–4 in SEC play, and finished ranked #6 in the Coaches Poll and #10 in the AP Poll. Arkansas's season ended when they lost to eventual national champion Baylor in the Elite Eight.

== Previous season ==
The Razorbacks finished the 2019–20 season with a record of 20–12, 7–11 in SEC play to finish in a tie for 10th place. Junior Mason Jones won a share of the SEC Player of the Year award and was named a consensus First-Team All-SEC player.

Arkansas started the season strong, going into conference play with an 11–1 record, including two road wins against Power Five teams, Georgia Tech and Indiana.

After winning their first-round game against Vanderbilt on March 11, 2020, the Hogs were slated for a rematch against South Carolina in the second round, but the SEC announced on March 12, 2020 that the SEC Tournament was cancelled due to the COVID-19 pandemic, with an announcement following from the NCAA later that day that the whole tournament was cancelled, along with all other winter and spring championships, ending the Razorbacks' season.

They finished with 20 wins against 12 losses in coach Eric Musselman's first season. He was the first coach to win 20 games in his initial campaign at Arkansas since John Pelphrey won 23 in the 2007–08 season.

== Offseason ==
On August 1, 2020, star guard Isaiah Joe announced that he was withdrawing his name from the 2020 NBA draft and returning for his junior season. Joe was a member of the 2019 SEC All-Freshman Team and earned preseason All-SEC recognition prior to his sophomore season, before going on to lead the league in three-pointers made, rank fourth in the NCAA for three-pointers made per game, as well as being named SEC Player of the Week on December 30, 2019 before having knee surgery on February 4, 2020, which sidelined him for six games. Joe would have highlighted a group of three returnees with starting experience for the Hogs, but on August 17, 2020, sixteen days after his initial announcement, Joe reversed his decision and opted to declare for the 2020 NBA draft.

=== Departures ===
Name	Number	Pos.	Height	Weight	Year	Hometown	Notes
Adrio Bailey	2	F	6'6"	217	Senior	Clarence, Louisiana	Graduated
Reggie Chaney	35	F	6'8"	222	Sophomore	Tulsa, Oklahoma	Transferred to Houston
Jeantal Cylla	0	F	6'7"	215	Graduate Transfer	Lake Worth Beach, Florida	Graduated
Jalen Harris	5	G	6'2"	166	Junior	Wilson, North Carolina	Transferred to Georgetown
Isaiah Joe	1	G	6'5"	180	Sophomore	Fort Smith, Arkansas	Declared for 2020 NBA draft; selected 49th overall by the Philadelphia 76ers
Mason Jones	15	G	6'5"	200	Junior	DeSoto, Texas	Declared for 2020 NBA draft
Ty Stevens	12	G	6'2"	180	Junior	Republic, Missouri	Left the team
Jimmy Whitt Jr.	33	G	6'3"	175	Graduate Transfer	Columbia, Missouri	Graduated

=== Incoming transfers ===
Name	Pos.	Height	Weight	Year	Hometown	Notes
Justin Smith	F	6'7"	230	Graduate Student	Buffalo Grove, IL	Transferred from Indiana after graduating. Will have one year of eligibility beginning immediately.
Vance Jackson	F	6'9"	230	Graduate Student	Pasadena, CA	Transferred from New Mexico after graduating. Will have one year of eligibility beginning immediately.
Jalen Tate	G	6'6"	170	Graduate Student	Pickerington, OH	Transferred from Northern Kentucky after graduating. Will have one year of eligibility beginning immediately.

=== 2020 recruiting class ===
College recruiting information
Name	Hometown	School	Height	Weight	Commit date
Davonte Davis; SG	Jacksonville, AR	Jacksonville (AR)	6 ft 4 in (1.93 m)	175 lb (79 kg)	Oct 12, 2019
Davonte Davis; SG	Recruit ratings: Rivals: 247Sports: ESPN: (82)				
Moses Moody; SG	Little Rock, AR	Montverde Academy (FL)	6 ft 6 in (1.98 m)	205 lb (93 kg)	Nov 9, 2019
Moses Moody; SG	Recruit ratings: Rivals: 247Sports: ESPN: (87)				
Jaylin Williams; PF	Fort Smith, AR	Northside (AR)	6 ft 9 in (2.06 m)	230 lb (100 kg)	Nov 23, 2019
Jaylin Williams; PF	Recruit ratings: Rivals: 247Sports: ESPN: (82)				
Khalen Robinson; PG	Little Rock, AR	Oak Hill Academy (VA)	6 ft 0 in (1.83 m)	175 lb (79 kg)	Nov 28, 2019
Khalen Robinson; PG	Recruit ratings: Rivals: 247Sports: ESPN: (83)				
Overall recruit ranking: Rivals: 11 247Sports: 8 ESPN: 5
Note: In many cases, Scout, Rivals, 247Sports, On3, and ESPN may conflict in their listings of height and weight.; In these cases, the average was taken. ESPN grades are on a 100-point scale.; Sources: "Arkansas 2020 Basketball Commitments". Rivals.; "2020 Arkansas Razorbacks Recruiting Class". ESPN.; "2020 Team Ranking". Rivals.

=== 2021 Recruiting class ===
College recruiting information (2021)
Name	Hometown	School	Height	Weight	Commit date
Chance Moore; SG	Powder Springs, GA	McEachern (GA)	6 ft 5 in (1.96 m)	195 lb (88 kg)	Aug 8, 2020
Chance Moore; SG	Recruit ratings: Rivals: 247Sports: ESPN: (85)				
Overall recruit ranking: Rivals: 65 247Sports: 51 ESPN: —
Note: In many cases, Scout, Rivals, 247Sports, On3, and ESPN may conflict in their listings of height and weight.; In these cases, the average was taken. ESPN grades are on a 100-point scale.; Sources: "Arkansas 2021 Basketball Commitments". Rivals.; "2021 Arkansas Razorbacks Recruiting Class". ESPN.; "2021 Team Ranking". Rivals.

== Roster ==
2020–21 Arkansas Razorbacks men's basketball team
Players
Coaches

Pos.	#	Name	Height	Weight	Year	Previous school	Hometown
F	0	Justin Smith	6 ft 7 in (2.01 m)	230 lb (104 kg)	GS	Stevenson HS; Indiana	Buffalo Grove, Illinois
G	1	JD Notae	6 ft 1 in (1.85 m)	195 lb (88 kg)	RS Jr	Newton HS; Jacksonville	Covington, Georgia
F	2	Vance Jackson	6 ft 9 in (2.06 m)	238 lb (108 kg)	GS	Prolific Prep; New Mexico	Pasadena, California
G	3	Desi Sills	6 ft 2 in (1.88 m)	200 lb (91 kg)	Jr	Jonesboro HS	Jonesboro, Arkansas
G	4	Davonte Davis	6 ft 3 in (1.91 m)	180 lb (82 kg)	Fr	Jacksonville HS	Jacksonville, Arkansas
G	5	Moses Moody	6 ft 6 in (1.98 m)	205 lb (93 kg)	Fr	Montverde Academy	Little Rock, Arkansas
F	10	Jaylin Williams	6 ft 10 in (2.08 m)	245 lb (111 kg)	Fr	Northside HS	Fort Smith, Arkansas
G	11	Jalen Tate	6 ft 6 in (1.98 m)	175 lb (79 kg)	GS	Pickerington HS; Northern Kentucky	Pickerington, Ohio
G	12	Khalen Robinson	6 ft 0 in (1.83 m)	175 lb (79 kg)	Fr	Oak Hill Academy	Little Rock, Arkansas
F	13	Emeka Obukwelu	6 ft 8 in (2.03 m)	235 lb (107 kg)	RS Sr	Plano West HS; UT Tyler	Plano, Texas
F	20	Kamani Johnson	6 ft 7 in (2.01 m)	215 lb (98 kg)	RS Jr	Holy Spirit Preparatory School; UALR	Brooklyn, New York
F	22	Abayomi Iyiola	6 ft 9 in (2.06 m)	230 lb (104 kg)	RS Jr	Greenforest-McCalep Christian Academy; Stetson	Atlanta, Georgia
F	23	Connor Vanover	7 ft 3 in (2.21 m)	247 lb (112 kg)	RS So	Findlay Prep; California	Little Rock, Arkansas
F	24	Ethan Henderson	6 ft 8 in (2.03 m)	210 lb (95 kg)	Jr	Parkview Arts & Science HS	Little Rock, Arkansas
F	33	Bryson Morehead (W)	6 ft 8 in (2.03 m)	160 lb (73 kg)	Fr	Obra D. Tompkins HS	Katy, Texas

Head coach

- Eric Musselman (San Diego)

Assistant coach(es)

- Corey Williams (Oklahoma State)
- Clay Moser (UW–La Crosse)
- David Patrick (Louisiana)

Legend

- (C) Team captain
- (S) Suspended
- (I) Ineligible
- (W) Walk-on
- Injured
- Current redshirt

Roster
Last update: August 20, 2020

== Schedule and results ==
The Razorbacks cruised through a pandemic-shortened non-conference slate that originally featured a neutral site matchup at the BOK Center against Oklahoma and a bid to the MGM Resorts Main Event tournament in Las Vegas, Nevada. The non-conference schedule included a game against an in-state program, the University of Central Arkansas, for the first time since a match against Arkansas State in the 1987 NIT and the first time in the regular season since playing Arkansas Tech in 1950. The Razorbacks also defeated their eventual Sweet Sixteen opponent, Oral Roberts, in a non-conference game in Bud Walton Arena. Owning an 8–0 record heading into conference play, Arkansas started its SEC regular season with a road win against Auburn, but lost starter Justin Smith to an ankle injury that sidelined or limited him for the first third of conference play, which contributed to Arkansas getting off to a rough 2–4 start against SEC competition, including consecutive blowout losses on the road to LSU and Alabama.

After the losses to LSU and Alabama, which were sandwiched around the toughest practice of the Musselman era, the Razorbacks turned their season around and did not lose another regular season SEC game, winning eleven straight conference matchups and eleven out of their last twelve overall in the regular season, with the lone loss coming on the road against Oklahoma State. The conference winning streak included three wins against teams that beat the Razorbacks earlier in the season, two top-ten wins, and the Razorbacks' first top-ten road win since 2006. Arkansas became ranked for the first time since 2018 on February 15, 2021. The Razorbacks followed that up by being ranked in consecutive polls for the first time since 2015, then hosted their first ranked matchup in Fayetteville since 1998 when #6 Alabama came to town with a chance to clinch the SEC regular season championship before losing to Arkansas 81–66.

After winning every game in the month of February, the Razorbacks were ranked #12 before closing out the regular season in second place for the SEC title with a 13–4 conference record, their highest finish in league play since the 2014–15 season and as high as they had finished since winning the conference and national titles in 1994. Arkansas entered the 2021 SEC men's basketball tournament ranked #8, the team's highest ranking since the 1994–95 season. After beating Missouri in the quarterfinals and losing to LSU in the semifinals, the Razorbacks earned a 3 seed for the NCAA tournament, their highest seed since the 1994–95 season.

Arkansas advanced to the Elite Eight after victories against Colgate, Texas Tech, and Oral Roberts. Arkansas had not made a Sweet Sixteen appearance since 1996 and had not made it to the Elite Eight since 1995. The Hogs lost to eventual national champion Baylor in the Elite Eight. The Razorbacks finished the season ranked #10 in the AP Poll and #6 in the Coaches Poll; it was their first top-ten finish since 1995.

Senior guard Jalen Tate was named to the All-South Region team after his performance in the NCAA Tournament. Freshman guard Moses Moody was voted AP Honorable Mention All-American, 1st Team All-SEC, SEC Freshman of the Year, and SEC All-Freshman. Junior guard JD Notae was named SEC Sixth Man of the Year.

Date time, TV	Rank^{#}	Opponent^{#}	Result	Record	High points	High rebounds	High assists	Site (attendance) city, state
Regular season
November 25, 2020*; 6:30 p.m., SECN+		Mississippi Valley State	W 142–62	1–0	23 – Vanover	10 – Williams	7 – Notae	Bud Walton Arena (4,400); Fayetteville, AR
November 28, 2020*; 5:00 p.m., SECN+		North Texas	W 69–54	2–0	18 – Smith	16 – Vanover	3 – Notae	Bud Walton Arena (4,400); Fayetteville, AR
December 2, 2020*; 8:00 p.m., SECN		UT Arlington	W 72–60	3–0	24 – Moody	9 – Tied	4 – Tate	Bud Walton Arena (4,400); Fayetteville, AR
December 5, 2020*; 4:00 p.m., SECN		Lipscomb	W 86–50	4–0	18 – Moody	9 – Vanover	4 – Robinson	Bud Walton Arena (4,266); Fayetteville, AR
December 9, 2020*; 7:00 p.m., SECN+		Southern	W 79–44	5–0	14 – Davis	9 – Vanover	5 – Sills	Bud Walton Arena (3,256); Fayetteville, AR
December 12, 2020*; 7:00 p.m., SECN+		Central Arkansas	W 100–75	6–0	22 – Notae	10 – Vanover	11 – Tate	Bud Walton Arena (4,189); Fayetteville, AR
December 20, 2020*; 1:00 p.m., SECN		Oral Roberts	W 87–76	7–0	22 – Smith	17 – Smith	4 – Tate	Bud Walton Arena (4,201); Fayetteville, AR
December 22, 2020*; 4:00 p.m., SECN		Abilene Christian	W 85–72	8–0	21 – Moody	10 – Smith	5 – Tate	Bud Walton Arena (4,110); Fayetteville, AR
December 30, 2020; 6:00 p.m., ESPN2		at Auburn	W 97–85	9–0 (1–0)	23 – Sills	6 – Tied	4 – Tate	Auburn Arena (1,824); Auburn, AL
January 2, 2021; 11:00 a.m., CBS		No. 12 Missouri	L 68–81	9–1 (1–1)	19 – Notae	10 – Moody	2 – Tied	Bud Walton Arena (4,400); Fayetteville, AR
January 6, 2021; 6:00 p.m., ESPN2		at No. 10 Tennessee	L 74–79	9–2 (1–2)	19 – Notae	9 – Jackson	6 – Tate	Thompson–Boling Arena (4,191); Knoxville, TN
January 9, 2021; 2:30 p.m., SECN		Georgia	W 99–69	10–2 (2–2)	25 – Moody	7 – Davis	10 – Tate	Bud Walton Arena (4,400); Fayetteville, AR
January 13, 2021; 6:00 p.m., ESPN2		at LSU	L 76–92	10–3 (2–3)	22 – Notae	10 – Williams	2 – Tied	Pete Maravich Assembly Center (2,540); Baton Rouge, LA
January 16, 2021; 2:30 p.m., SECN		at Alabama	L 59–90	10–4 (2–4)	28 – Moody	9 – Moody	3 – Tate	Coleman Coliseum (2,055); Tuscaloosa, AL
January 20, 2021; 8:00 p.m., SECN		Auburn	W 75–73	11–4 (3–4)	22 – Sills	7 – Williams	5 – Tate	Bud Walton Arena (4,400); Fayetteville, AR
January 23, 2021; Noon, SECN		at Vanderbilt	W 92–71	12–4 (4–4)	26 – Moody	8 – Moody	8 – Tate	Memorial Gymnasium (83); Nashville, TN
January 27, 2021; 7:30 p.m., SECN		Ole Miss	W 74–59	13–4 (5–4)	19 – Notae	7 – Vanover	3 – Tate	Bud Walton Arena (4,400); Fayetteville, AR
January 30, 2021*; 3:00 p.m., ESPN2		at Oklahoma State; Big 12/SEC Challenge	L 77–81	13–5	18 – Smith	7 – Smith	4 – Smith	Gallagher-Iba Arena (3,350); Stillwater, OK
February 2, 2021; 8:00 p.m., SECN		Mississippi State	W 61–45	14–5 (6–4)	13 – Tied	10 – Smith	5 – Tate	Bud Walton Arena (4,400); Fayetteville, AR
February 9, 2021; 6:00 p.m., ESPN		at Kentucky	W 81–80	15–5 (7–4)	15 – Tate	7 – Moody	3 – Tied	Rupp Arena (3,075); Lexington, KY
February 13, 2021; 3:00 p.m., ESPN2		at No. 10 Missouri	W 86–81 ^{OT}	16–5 (8–4)	19 – Smith	6 – Smith	4 – Tate	Mizzou Arena (3,111); Columbia, MO
February 16, 2021; 6:00 p.m., ESPN2	No. 24	Florida	W 75–64	17–5 (9–4)	18 – Davis	10 – Williams	4 – Smith	Bud Walton Arena (4,400); Fayetteville, AR
February 20, 2021; 7:30 p.m., SECN	No. 24	at Texas A&M	Cancelled due to COVID-19 issues within the Texas A&M program					Reed Arena; College Station, TX
February 24, 2021; 8:00 p.m., ESPN2	No. 20	No. 6 Alabama	W 81–66	18–5 (10–4)	24 – Moody	12 – Smith	4 – Tied	Bud Walton Arena (4,400); Fayetteville, AR
February 27, 2021; 1:00 p.m., ESPN2	No. 20	LSU	W 83–75	19–5 (11–4)	19 – Smith	10 – Smith	6 – Davis	Bud Walton Arena (4,400); Fayetteville, AR
March 2, 2021; 5:30 p.m., SECN	No. 12	at South Carolina	W 101–73	20–5 (12–4)	28 – Moody	8 – Tied	5 – Notae	Colonial Life Arena (3,193); Columbia, SC
March 6, 2021; 4:00 p.m., SECN	No. 12	Texas A&M	W 87–80	21–5 (13–4)	28 – Moody	7 – Tate	5 – Davis	Bud Walton Arena (4,400); Fayetteville, AR
SEC Tournament
March 12, 2021; 6:00 pm, SECN	(2) No. 8	vs. (7) Missouri; Quarterfinals	W 70–64	22–5	27 – Notae	8 – Tied	4 – Tied	Bridgestone Arena (2,155); Nashville, TN
March 13, 2021; 2:30 pm, ESPN	(2) No. 8	vs. (3) LSU; Semifinals	L 71–78	22–6	28 – Moody	9 – Moody	5 – Davis	Bridgestone Arena (3,164); Nashville, TN
NCAA Tournament
March 19, 2021; 11:45 am, truTV	(3 S) No. 10	vs. (14 S) Colgate; First Round	W 85–68	23–6	29 – Smith	13 – Smith	4 – Tate	Bankers Life Fieldhouse; Indianapolis, IN
March 21, 2021; 5:10 pm, TNT	(3 S) No. 10	vs. (6 S) No. 21 Texas Tech; Second Round	W 68–66	24–6	20 – Smith	10 – Williams	4 – Williams	Hinkle Fieldhouse; Indianapolis, IN
March 27, 2021; 6:25 p.m., TBS	(3 S) No. 10	vs. (15 S) Oral Roberts; Sweet Sixteen	W 72–70	25–6	22 – Tate	14 – Smith	6 – Tate	Bankers Life Fieldhouse; Indianapolis, IN
March 29, 2021; 8:57 p.m., CBS	(3 S) No. 10	vs. (1 S) No. 3 Baylor; Elite Eight	L 72–81	25–7	14 – Tied	4 – Sills	6 – Tied	Lucas Oil Stadium (7,519); Indianapolis, IN
*Non-conference game. ^{#}Rankings from AP Poll. (#) Tournament seedings in parentheses. All times are in Central Time.

== See also ==
- 2020–21 Arkansas Razorbacks women's basketball team
