= 2019–20 Arkansas Razorbacks men's basketball team =

American college basketball season

2019–20 Arkansas Razorbacks men's basketball
- Conference: Southeastern Conference
- Record: 20–12 (7–11 SEC)
- Head coach: Eric Musselman (1st season)
- Associate head coach: Chris Crutchfield (1st season)
- Assistant coaches: Corey Williams; Clay Moser
- Home arena: Bud Walton Arena

2019–20 Southeastern Conference men's basketball standings
	Conf.				Overall
Team	W		L	PCT	W		L	PCT
No. 8 Kentucky	15	–	3	.833	25	–	6	.806
No. 20 Auburn	12	–	6	.667	25	–	6	.806
LSU	12	–	6	.667	21	–	10	.677
Mississippi State	11	–	7	.611	20	–	11	.645
Florida	11	–	7	.611	19	–	12	.613
South Carolina	10	–	8	.556	18	–	13	.581
Texas A&M	10	–	8	.556	16	–	14	.533
Tennessee	9	–	9	.500	17	–	14	.548
Alabama	8	–	10	.444	16	–	15	.516
Arkansas	7	–	11	.389	20	–	12	.625
Missouri	7	–	11	.389	15	–	16	.484
Ole Miss	6	–	12	.333	15	–	17	.469
Georgia	5	–	13	.278	16	–	16	.500
Vanderbilt	3	–	15	.167	11	–	21	.344
Note: The 2020 SEC tournament was canceled after the first round due to the COVID-19 pandemic. Rankings from AP poll

The 2019–20 Arkansas Razorbacks men's basketball team represented the University of Arkansas during the 2019–20 season. The team was led by first-year head coach Eric Musselman, and played their home games at Bud Walton Arena in Fayetteville, Arkansas as a member of the Southeastern Conference. The Razorbacks finished with a record of 20–12 (7–11), with junior Mason Jones earning a share of the SEC Player of the Year award and being named a consensus First-Team All-SEC player.

== Previous season ==
On March 26, 2019, Arkansas athletic director Hunter Yurachek fired former head coach Mike Anderson. Following a 12-day search, Yurachek announced Musselman's hiring on April 7.

Former guard Keyshawn Embery-Simpson had already announced following Anderson's firing that he would be leaving the school and transferring to Tulsa.

== Offseason ==
=== Departures ===
Name	Number	Pos.	Height	Weight	Year	Hometown	Notes
Daniel Gafford	10	F	6'11"	233	Sophomore	El Dorado, Arkansas	Declared for the NBA draft; selected 38th overall by the Chicago Bulls.
Keyshawn Embery-Simpson	11	G	6'3"	202	Freshman	Midwest City, Oklahoma	Transferred to Tulsa
Gabe Osabuohien	22	F	6'8"	221	Sophomore	Toronto, Ontario	Dismissed from team; transferred to West Virginia
Justice Hill	–	G	5'11"	202	Freshman	Little Rock, Arkansas	Transferred to Salt Lake CC

=== Incoming transfers ===
Name	Pos.	Height	Weight	Year	Hometown	Notes
Jimmy Whitt Jr.	G	6'3"	175	Graduate Student	Columbia, MO	Transferred from SMU after graduating. Will have one year of eligibility beginning immediately.
Jeantal Cylla	F	6'7"	215	Graduate Student	Lake Worth, FL	Transferred from UNC Wilmington after graduating. Will have one year of eligibility beginning immediately.
JD Notae	G	6'2"	185	Junior	Covington, GA	Transferred from Jacksonville. Under NCAA transfer rules, Notae will have to sit out the 2019–20 season. Will have two years of remaining eligibility.
Connor Vanover	F	7'3"	230	Sophomore	Little Rock, AR	Transferred from California. Under NCAA transfer rules, Vanover will have to sit out the 2019–20 season. Will have three years of remaining eligibility.
Abayomi Iyiola	F	6'9"	210	Junior	Atlanta, GA	Transferred from Stetson. Under NCAA transfer rules, Iyiloa will have to sit out the 2019–20 season. Will have two years of remaining eligibility.

Jamario Bell would also join the team with one year of eligibility after his career with the Arkansas football team ended.

=== 2019 recruiting class ===
College recruiting
Name	Hometown	School	Height	Weight	Commit date
Justice Hill; PG	Little Rock, Arkansas	LR Christian	5 ft 11 in (1.80 m)	170 lb (77 kg)	Nov 14, 2018
Justice Hill; PG	Recruit ratings: Scout: Rivals: 247Sports: ESPN:				
Overall recruit ranking:
Note: In many cases, Scout, Rivals, 247Sports, On3, and ESPN may conflict in their listings of height and weight.; In these cases, the average was taken. ESPN grades are on a 100-point scale.; Sources: "2019 Arkansas Commits". Rivals.; "2019 Team Ranking". Rivals.

=== 2020 Recruiting class ===
College recruiting (2020)
Name	Hometown	School	Height	Weight	Commit date
Davonte Davis; SG	Jacksonville, AR	Jacksonville (AR)	6 ft 4 in (1.93 m)	175 lb (79 kg)	Oct 12, 2019
Davonte Davis; SG	Recruit ratings: Rivals: 247Sports: ESPN: (82)				
Moses Moody; SG	Little Rock, AR	Montverde Academy (FL)	6 ft 6 in (1.98 m)	205 lb (93 kg)	Nov 9, 2019
Moses Moody; SG	Recruit ratings: Rivals: 247Sports: ESPN: (87)				
Jaylin Williams; PF	Fort Smith, AR	Northside (AR)	6 ft 9 in (2.06 m)	230 lb (100 kg)	Nov 23, 2019
Jaylin Williams; PF	Recruit ratings: Rivals: 247Sports: ESPN: (82)				
Khalen Robinson; PG	Little Rock, AR	Oak Hill Academy (VA)	6 ft 0 in (1.83 m)	175 lb (79 kg)	Nov 28, 2019
Khalen Robinson; PG	Recruit ratings: Rivals: 247Sports: ESPN: (83)				
Overall recruit ranking: Rivals: 11 247Sports: 8 ESPN: 5
Note: In many cases, Scout, Rivals, 247Sports, On3, and ESPN may conflict in their listings of height and weight.; In these cases, the average was taken. ESPN grades are on a 100-point scale.; Sources: "Arkansas 2020 Basketball Commitments". Rivals.; "2020 Arkansas Razorbacks Recruiting Class". ESPN.; "2020 Team Ranking". Rivals.

== Preseason ==
=== SEC media poll ===
The SEC media poll was released on October 15, 2019.

Media poll
Predicted finish	Team
1	Kentucky
2	Florida
3	LSU
4	Auburn
5	Tennessee
6	Alabama
7	Mississippi State
8	Ole Miss
9	Georgia
10	South Carolina
11	Arkansas
12	Texas A&M
13	Missouri
14	Vanderbilt

=== Preseason All-SEC teams ===
The Razorbacks had one player selected to the preseason all-SEC teams.

Second Team

Isaiah Joe

== Roster ==
2019–20 Arkansas Razorbacks men's basketball team
Players
Coaches

Pos.	#	Name	Height	Weight	Year	Previous school	Hometown
F	0	Jeantal Cylla	6 ft 7 in (2.01 m)	215 lb (98 kg)	GS	Lake Worth Community HS; UNC Wilmington	Lake Worth, Florida
G	1	Isaiah Joe	6 ft 5 in (1.96 m)	180 lb (82 kg)	So	Northside HS	Fort Smith, Arkansas
F	2	Adrio Bailey	6 ft 6 in (1.98 m)	217 lb (98 kg)	Sr	Lakeview HS	Clarence, Louisiana
G	3	Desi Sills	6 ft 1 in (1.85 m)	196 lb (89 kg)	So	Jonesboro HS	Jonesboro, Arkansas
G	5	Jalen Harris	6 ft 2 in (1.88 m)	166 lb (75 kg)	RS Jr	Word of God Christian Academy; New Mexico	Wilson, North Carolina
G	11	JD Notae (redshirt)	6 ft 2 in (1.88 m)	185 lb (84 kg)	Jr	Newton HS; Jacksonville University	Covington, Georgia
G	12	Ty Stevens (W)	6 ft 2 in (1.88 m)	180 lb (82 kg)	Jr	Republic HS	Republic, Missouri
F	13	Emeka Obukwelu	6 ft 8 in (2.03 m)	222 lb (101 kg)	RS Jr	Plano West Senior HS; UT-Tyler	Plano, Texas
F	14	Jamario Bell	6 ft 5 in (1.96 m)	250 lb (113 kg)	Sr	Junction City HS	Junction City, Arkansas
G	15	Mason Jones	6 ft 5 in (1.96 m)	200 lb (91 kg)	Jr	Triple A Academy; Connors State College	DeSoto, Texas
F	22	Abayomi Iyiola (redshirt)	6 ft 9 in (2.06 m)	210 lb (95 kg)	Jr	Greenforest-McCalep Christian Academy; Stetson	Atlanta, Georgia
F	23	Connor Vanover (redshirt)	7 ft 3 in (2.21 m)	230 lb (104 kg)	So	Findlay Prep; California	Little Rock, Arkansas
F	24	Ethan Henderson	6 ft 8 in (2.03 m)	210 lb (95 kg)	So	Parkview Arts & Science HS	Little Rock, Arkansas
G	33	Jimmy Whitt Jr.	6 ft 3 in (1.91 m)	175 lb (79 kg)	GS	Hickman HS; SMU	Columbia, Missouri
F	35	Reggie Chaney	6 ft 8 in (2.03 m)	222 lb (101 kg)	So	Findlay Prep	Tulsa, Oklahoma

Head coach

- Eric Musselman (San Diego)

Assistant coach(es)

- Corey Williams
- Clay Moser
- Chris Crutchfield

Legend

- (C) Team captain
- (S) Suspended
- (I) Ineligible
- (W) Walk-on
- Injured
- Current redshirt

Roster
Last update: 2019-07-28

== Schedule and results ==
Arkansas started the season strongly, going into conference play with an 11–1 record, including two road wins against Power Five teams, Georgia Tech and Indiana. The first quarter of conference play was promising for the Razorbacks, with the only setback coming on the road against LSU, 79–77. Heading into a highly anticipated home game with #10 Kentucky, the Hogs were 14–2, with a 3–1 conference record. Arkansas led with less than nine minutes left in the game when Kentucky head coach John Calipari was ejected, sparking a Kentucky run and victory. From there the season bottomed out, with the Hogs finishing the last fourteen games of the conference season with a record of 4–10 for a final regular season record of 19–12 (7–11), including a five-game losing streak without star guard Isaiah Joe that featured back-to-back overtime losses for the first time in school history, in addition to a one-point loss. Heading into the last quarter of the conference season, Arkansas avenged earlier losses to Missouri and Tennessee, placing the Hogs back on the bubble, but fell on the road to thirteenth-place Georgia, effectively knocking the Razorbacks out of tournament contention. After splitting the last two games of the season at home against LSU and on the road against Texas A&M, the Hogs were on the outside looking in, most likely needing to win the SEC tournament to receive an NCAA tournament bid.

After winning their first-round game against Vanderbilt on March 11, 2020, the Hogs were slated for a rematch against South Carolina in the second round, but the SEC announced on March 12, 2020, that the SEC Tournament was cancelled due to the COVID-19 pandemic, with an announcement following from the NCAA later that day that the whole tournament was cancelled, along with all other winter and spring championships, ending the Razorbacks' season.

The Razorbacks received some votes for the AP Poll throughout the non-conference season, but never earned a ranking, and stopped receiving votes by the end of January.

Mason Jones was voted the SEC Player of the Year by the league media, sharing the honor with Reggie Perry, a Mississippi State player and former Arkansas commit, while the coaches' award went to Immanuel Quickley, of Kentucky. Jones was the third Razorback to win the award, along with Bobby Portis and Corliss Williamson. Jones had an outstanding season, being named SEC Player of the Week four times, one of three SEC players to ever do so and the first in over a decade. Jones led the SEC in scoring, becoming the first Razorback to claim the SEC scoring title, while also finishing ranked eighth in the country for points per game. Jones led the NCAA in both free throw attempts and makes, while also having nine thirty-point games, the most by an SEC player in two decades. Jones broke Sidney Moncrief's school record for free throws made in a season, in addition to being one of only three players in the previous thirty years to score forty points in a game multiple times in a season. Jones was named a consensus First-Team All-SEC player, the tenth time an Arkansas player has achieved that honor. Jones was also named an Honorable Mention All-American by the Associated Press (AP).

Date time, TV	Rank^{#}	Opponent^{#}	Result	Record	High points	High rebounds	High assists	Site (attendance) city, state
Exhibition
October 20, 2019*; 3:00 pm		Little Rock	W 79–64		25 – Joe	9 – Whitt Jr.	3 – Tied	Bud Walton Arena (7,364); Fayetteville, AR
October 25, 2019*; 7:00 pm		Southwestern Oklahoma State	W 78–51		22 – Jones	9 – Chaney	5 – Sills	Bud Walton Arena (3,509); Fayetteville, AR
Regular season
November 5, 2019*; 7:00 pm, SECN+		Rice	W 91–43	1–0	32 – Jones	9 – Bailey	7 – Joe	Bud Walton Arena (17,274); Fayetteville, AR
November 12, 2019*; 7:00 pm, SECN+		North Texas	W 66–43	2–0	16 – 2 tied	6 – Jones	2 – 2 tied	Bud Walton Arena (12,001); Fayetteville, AR
November 16, 2019*; 4:00 pm, SECN+		Montana; College Hoops Roadshow	W 64–46	3–0	19 – Jones	11 – Bailey	4 – Jones	Bud Walton Arena (13,058); Fayetteville, AR
November 19, 2019*; 7:00 pm, SECN+		Texas Southern; College Hoops Roadshow	W 82–51	4–0	33 – Joe	10 – Whitt Jr.	5 – Harris	Bud Walton Arena (11,182); Fayetteville, AR
November 22, 2019*; 8:00 pm, SECN		South Dakota; College Hoops Roadshow	W 77–56	5–0	24 – Whitt Jr.	7 – Tied	5 – Joe	Bud Walton Arena (12,581); Fayetteville, AR
November 26, 2019*; 6:00 pm, ACCN		at Georgia Tech	W 62–61 ^{OT}	6–0	24 – Jones	9 – Joe	4 – Sills	Hank McCamish Pavilion (6,547); Atlanta, GA
November 30, 2019*; 4:00 pm, SECN+		Northern Kentucky; College Hoops Roadshow	W 66–60	7–0	24 – Whitt Jr.	11 – Chaney	5 – 2 tied	Bud Walton Arena (14,080); Fayetteville, AR
December 3, 2019*; 7:00 pm, SECN+		Austin Peay	W 69–61	8–0	17 – Whitt Jr.	6 – Joe	3 – Harris	Bud Walton Arena (11,995); Fayetteville, AR
December 7, 2019*; 6:30 pm, CBSSN		at Western Kentucky	L 79–86 ^{OT}	8–1	20 – Sills	12 – Whitt Jr.	4 – Whitt Jr.	E. A. Diddle Arena (6,862); Bowling Green, KY
December 14, 2019*; 12:30 pm, ESPNU		Tulsa	W 98–79	9–1	41 – Jones	7 – Chaney	4 – Tied	Bud Walton Arena (15,589); Fayetteville, AR
December 21, 2019*; 7:00 pm		vs. Valparaiso	W 72–68	10–1	21 – Joe	9 – Jones	4 – 2 tied	Simmons Bank Arena (15,630); North Little Rock, AR
December 29, 2019*; 5:00 pm, BTN		at Indiana	W 71–64	11–1	24 – Joe	8 – Bailey	6 – Jones	Simon Skjodt Assembly Hall (14,892); Bloomington, IN
January 4, 2020; 6:00 pm, SECN		Texas A&M	W 69–59	12–1 (1–0)	17 – 2 tied	6 – Jones	5 – Harris	Bud Walton Arena (19,200); Fayetteville, AR
January 8, 2020; 8:00 pm, ESPNU		at LSU	L 77–79	12–2 (1–1)	24 – Jones	7 – Bailey	4 – Jones	Pete Maravich Assembly Center (8,662); Baton Rouge, LA
January 11, 2020; 5:00 pm, SECN		at Ole Miss	W 76–72	13–2 (2–1)	34 – Joe	6 – Jones	9 – Jones	The Pavilion at Ole Miss (8,233); Oxford, MS
January 15, 2020; 7:30 pm, SECN		Vanderbilt	W 75–55	14–2 (3–1)	30 – Whitt Jr.	8 – Whitt Jr.	8 – Jones	Bud Walton Arena (14,321); Fayetteville, AR
January 18, 2020; 3:00 pm, ESPN		No. 10 Kentucky	L 66–73	14–3 (3–2)	19 – Jones	6 – Jones	2 – Tied	Bud Walton Arena (19,200); Fayetteville, AR
January 22, 2020; 6:00 pm, SECN		at Mississippi State	L 70–77	14–4 (3–3)	20 – Tied	7 – Tied	4 – Jones	Humphrey Coliseum (6,337); Starkville, MS
January 25, 2020*; 3:00 pm, ESPN2		TCU; Big 12/SEC Challenge	W 78–67	15–4	22 – Whitt Jr.	6 – Bailey	6 – Harris	Bud Walton Arena (19,200); Fayetteville, AR
January 29, 2020; 7:30 pm, SECN		South Carolina	L 77–79	15–5 (3–4)	34 – Jones	12 – Jones	4 – Jones	Bud Walton Arena (14,085); Fayetteville, AR
February 1, 2020; 5:00 pm, SECN		at Alabama	W 82–78	16–5 (4–4)	30 – Jones	11 – Chaney	2 – Tied	Coleman Coliseum (12,461); Tuscaloosa, AL
February 4, 2020; 6:00 pm, SECN		No. 11 Auburn	L 76–79 ^{OT}	16–6 (4–5)	40 – Jones	7 – Tied	5 – Jones	Bud Walton Arena (17,196); Fayetteville, AR
February 8, 2020; 2:30 pm, SECN		at Missouri	L 79–83 ^{OT}	16–7 (4–6)	17 – Tied	11 – Chaney	4 – Harris	Mizzou Arena (11,439); Columbia, MO
February 11, 2020; 6:00 pm, SECN		at Tennessee	L 61–82	16–8 (4–7)	19 – Whitt Jr.	6 – Chaney	2 – Tied	Thompson–Boling Arena (17,222); Knoxville, TN
February 15, 2020; 12:00 pm, SECN		Mississippi State	L 77–78	16–9 (4–8)	38 – Jones	6 – Tied	3 – Whitt Jr.	Bud Walton Arena (19,200); Fayetteville, AR
February 18, 2020; 6:00 pm, ESPNU		at Florida	L 59–73	16–10 (4–9)	21 – Jones	8 – Bailey	5 – Jones	O'Connell Center (9,023); Gainesville, FL
February 22, 2020; 12:00 pm, SECN		Missouri	W 78–68	17–10 (5–9)	21 – Joe	8 – Jones	4 – Jones	Bud Walton Arena (19,200); Fayetteville, AR
February 26, 2020; 7:30 pm, SECN		Tennessee	W 86–69	18–10 (6–9)	37 – Jones	9 – Henderson	4 – Whitt Jr.	Bud Walton Arena (14,101); Fayetteville, AR
February 29, 2020; 5:00 pm, SECN		at Georgia	L 89–99	18–11 (6–10)	26 – Tied	6 – Sills	6 – Whitt Jr.	Stegeman Coliseum (10,017); Athens, GA
March 4, 2020; 6:00 pm, SECN		LSU	W 99–90	19–11 (7–10)	36 – Jones	15 – Whitt Jr.	5 – Whitt Jr.	Bud Walton Arena (15,169); Fayetteville, AR
March 7, 2020; 3:30 pm, SECN		at Texas A&M	L 69–77	19–12 (7–11)	30 – Jones	5 – Tied	4 – Whitt Jr.	Reed Arena (8,443); College Station, TX
SEC Tournament
March 11, 2020; 8:30 pm, SECN	(11)	vs. (14) Vanderbilt; First round	W 86–73	20–12	22 – Jones	6 – Jones	6 – Jones	Bridgestone Arena; Nashville, TN
*Non-conference game. ^{#}Rankings from AP Poll. (#) Tournament seedings in parentheses. All times are in Central Time.

== See also ==
- 2019–20 Arkansas Razorbacks women's basketball team
