= 2019–20 Texas A&M Aggies men's basketball team =

American college basketball season

2019–20 Texas A&M Aggies men's basketball
- Conference: Southeastern Conference
- Record: 16–14 (10–8 SEC)
- Head coach: Buzz Williams (1st season)
- Assistant coaches: Devin Johnson; Jamie McNeilly; Lyle Wolf
- Home arena: Reed Arena

2019–20 Southeastern Conference men's basketball standings
	Conf.				Overall
Team	W		L	PCT	W		L	PCT
No. 8 Kentucky	15	–	3	.833	25	–	6	.806
No. 20 Auburn	12	–	6	.667	25	–	6	.806
LSU	12	–	6	.667	21	–	10	.677
Mississippi State	11	–	7	.611	20	–	11	.645
Florida	11	–	7	.611	19	–	12	.613
South Carolina	10	–	8	.556	18	–	13	.581
Texas A&M	10	–	8	.556	16	–	14	.533
Tennessee	9	–	9	.500	17	–	14	.548
Alabama	8	–	10	.444	16	–	15	.516
Arkansas	7	–	11	.389	20	–	12	.625
Missouri	7	–	11	.389	15	–	16	.484
Ole Miss	6	–	12	.333	15	–	17	.469
Georgia	5	–	13	.278	16	–	16	.500
Vanderbilt	3	–	15	.167	11	–	21	.344
Note: The 2020 SEC tournament was canceled after the first round due to the COVID-19 pandemic. Rankings from AP poll

The 2019–20 Texas A&M Aggies men's basketball team represented Texas A&M University in the 2019–20 NCAA Division I men's basketball season. The Aggies were coached by first-year head coach Buzz Williams. The Aggies played their home games at Reed Arena in College Station, Texas as members of the Southeastern Conference (SEC). They finished the season 16–14, 10–8 in SEC play to finish in a tie for sixth place. They were set to take on Missouri in the second round of the SEC tournament. However, the remainder of the SEC Tournament was cancelled amid the COVID-19 pandemic.

== Previous season ==
The Aggies finished the season 14–18, 6–12 in SEC play to finish in 11th place. They defeated Vanderbilt in the first round of the SEC tournament before losing to Mississippi State.

On March 15, 2019, the school fired head coach Billy Kennedy after eight seasons. On April 3, the school hired Virginia Tech head coach Buzz Williams as the team's next head coach.

== Offseason ==
=== Departures ===
Name	Number	Pos.	Height	Weight	Year	Hometown	Reason for departure
Admon Gilder	3	G	6'4"	199	Senior	Dallas, TX	Graduate transferred to Gonzaga
Chris Collins	12	G	6'2"	181	RS Senior	Friendswood, TX	Walk-on; graduated
Brandon Mahan	13	G	6'5"	200	Sophomore	Birmingham, AL	Transferred to UCF
Isiah Jasey	15	F	6'10"	246	Sophomore	Killeen, TX	Transferred to SMU
John Brown	20	F	6'10"	220	RS Sophomore	Magnolia, TX	Transferred to West Texas A&M
Christian Mekowulu	21	F	6'9"	245	RS Senior	Lagos, Nigeria	Graduated
Frank Byers	22	G	5'10"	180	Senior	Dallas, TX	Graduated
John Walker III	24	F	6'9"	196	RS Freshman	Missouri City, TX	Transferred to Texas Southern
Cameron Alo	33	G	5'9"	174	Sophomore	Houston, TX	Walk-on; left team for personal reasons

=== Incoming transfers ===
Name	Number	Pos.	Height	Weight	Year	Hometown	Previous college
Quenton Jackson	3	G	6'5"	180	Junior	Inglewood, CA	Junior college transferred from College of Central Florida.

=== 2019 recruiting class ===
College recruiting information
Name	Hometown	School	Height	Weight	Commit date
Emanuel Miller; SF	Toronto, ON	Prolific Prep	6 ft 6 in (1.98 m)	200 lb (91 kg)	May 7, 2019
Emanuel Miller; SF	Recruit ratings: Scout: Rivals: 247Sports: ESPN: (81)				
Andre Gordon; PG	Sidney, OH	Sidney High School	6 ft 2 in (1.88 m)	185 lb (84 kg)	Apr 13, 2019
Andre Gordon; PG	Recruit ratings: Scout: Rivals: 247Sports: ESPN: (81)				
Yavuz Gultekin; PF	Cumberland, MD	Bishop Walsh High School	6 ft 8 in (2.03 m)	195 lb (88 kg)	Apr 13, 2019
Yavuz Gultekin; PF	Recruit ratings: Scout: Rivals: 247Sports: ESPN: (80)				
Jonathan Aku; C	McKinney, TX	The Entrepreneur Academy	6 ft 9 in (2.06 m)	210 lb (95 kg)	Aug 11, 2019
Jonathan Aku; C	Recruit ratings: Scout: Rivals: 247Sports: ESPN: (80)				
Bakari Simmons; SG	Chicago, IL	Victory Rock Prep	6 ft 6 in (1.98 m)	210 lb (95 kg)	Jul 2, 2019
Bakari Simmons; SG	Recruit ratings: Scout: Rivals: 247Sports: ESPN: (POST)				
Cashius McNeilly; SG	Toronto, ON	Thornlea Secondary School	6 ft 4 in (1.93 m)	180 lb (82 kg)	Apr 13, 2019
Cashius McNeilly; SG	Recruit ratings: Scout: Rivals: 247Sports: ESPN: (0)				
Overall recruit ranking:
Note: In many cases, Scout, Rivals, 247Sports, On3, and ESPN may conflict in their listings of height and weight.; In these cases, the average was taken. ESPN grades are on a 100-point scale.; Sources: "Texas A&M 2019 Basketball Commitments". Rivals.; "2019 Team Ranking". Rivals.

=== 2020 recruiting class ===
College recruiting information (2020)
Name	Hometown	School	Height	Weight	Commit date
Hayden Hefner; SG	Nederland, TX	Nederland High School	6 ft 5 in (1.96 m)	180 lb (82 kg)	Aug 4, 2019
Hayden Hefner; SG	Recruit ratings: Scout: Rivals: 247Sports: ESPN: (0)				
Overall recruit ranking:
Note: In many cases, Scout, Rivals, 247Sports, On3, and ESPN may conflict in their listings of height and weight.; In these cases, the average was taken. ESPN grades are on a 100-point scale.; Sources: "Texas A&M 2020 Basketball Commitments". Rivals.; "2020 Team Ranking". Rivals.

== Preseason ==
=== SEC media poll ===
The SEC media poll was released on October 15, 2019.

Media poll
Predicted finish	Team
1	Kentucky
2	Florida
3	LSU
4	Auburn
5	Tennessee
6	Alabama
7	Mississippi State
8	Ole Miss
9	Georgia
10	South Carolina
11	Arkansas
12	Texas A&M
13	Missouri
14	Vanderbilt

== Roster ==
2019–20 Texas A&M Aggies men's basketball team
Players
Coaches

Pos.	#	Name	Height	Weight	Year	Previous school	Hometown
G	0	Jay Jay Chandler	6 ft 4 in (1.93 m)	180 lb (82 kg)	Jr	Cinco Ranch	Katy, Texas
G/F	1	Savion Flagg	6 ft 7 in (2.01 m)	223 lb (101 kg)	Jr	Alvin	Alvin, Texas
G	2	TJ Starks	6 ft 2 in (1.88 m)	208 lb (94 kg)	Sr	Lancaster	Lancaster, Texas
G	3	Quenton Jackson	6 ft 5 in (1.96 m)	171 lb (78 kg)	Jr	Mira Costa; College of Central Florida	Los Angeles, California
F	5	Emanuel Miller	6 ft 7 in (2.01 m)	213 lb (97 kg)	Fr	Prolific Prep (CA)	Scarborough, Ontario
C	10	Everett Vaughn (W)	6 ft 10 in (2.08 m)	237 lb (108 kg)	RS Fr	St. Thomas	Bellaire, Texas
G	11	Wendell Mitchell	6 ft 3 in (1.91 m)	183 lb (83 kg)	RS Sr	Rockdale; Baylor/Trinity Valley CC	Rockdale, Texas
G	12	Mark French	5 ft 8 in (1.73 m)	162 lb (73 kg)	Sr	Prestonwood Christian	Plano, Texas
G	13	Cashius McNeilly	6 ft 4 in (1.93 m)	191 lb (87 kg)	Fr	Thornlea Secondary School	Scarborough, Ontario
F	15	Jonathan Aku	6 ft 10 in (2.08 m)	245 lb (111 kg)	Fr	iSchool Entrepreneurial Academy (TX)	Kaduna, Nigeria
G	20	Andre Gordon	6 ft 2 in (1.88 m)	185 lb (84 kg)	Fr	Sidney	Sidney, Ohio
G	21	Zach Walker (W)	6 ft 4 in (1.93 m)	195 lb (88 kg)	So	Deer Park	Deer Park, Texas
F	25	Bakari Simmons	6 ft 4 in (1.93 m)	210 lb (95 kg)	Fr	Simeon	Chicago, Illinois
F	31	Luke McGhee (W)	6 ft 8 in (2.03 m)	237 lb (108 kg)	RS Fr	Clark	San Antonio, Texas
F	32	Josh Nebo	6 ft 9 in (2.06 m)	244 lb (111 kg)	RS Sr	Cypress Lakes; Saint Francis	Houston, Texas
F	35	Yavuz Gultekin	6 ft 7 in (2.01 m)	201 lb (91 kg)	Fr	Bishop Walsh (MD)	Karşıyaka, Turkey

Head coach

- Buzz Williams (Oklahoma City)

Assistant coach(es)

- Devin Johnson (New Orleans)
- Jamie McNeilly (New Orleans)
- Lyle Wolf (Transylvania)

Legend

- (C) Team captain
- (S) Suspended
- (I) Ineligible
- (W) Walk-on
- Injured
- Current redshirt

Roster

== Schedule and results ==
Date time, TV	Rank^{#}	Opponent^{#}	Result	Record	High points	High rebounds	High assists	Site (attendance) city, state
Exhibition
November 1, 2019*; 8:00 pm		Texas A&M–Kingsville	W 81–74	–	16 – Jackson	7 – Flagg	7 – Flagg	Reed Arena; College Station, TX
Regular season
November 6, 2019*; 7:00 pm, SECN+		Northwestern State	W 77–63	1–0	22 – Flagg	7 – Tied	5 – Flagg	Reed Arena (5,751); College Station, TX
November 11, 2019*; 7:00 pm, SECN+		Louisiana–Monroe	W 63–57	2–0	17 – Chandler	6 – Tied	3 – Jackson	Reed Arena (5,018); College Station, TX
November 15, 2019*; 8:00 pm, SECN		No. 8 Gonzaga	L 49–79	2–1	14 – Mitchell	6 – Miller	2 – Tied	Reed Arena (10,344); College Station, TX
November 20, 2019*; 7:00 pm, SECN+		Troy	W 56–52	3–1	14 – Nebo	12 – Nebo	3 – Tied	Reed Arena (5,271); College Station, TX
November 28, 2019*; 12:30 pm, ESPN2		vs. Harvard; Orlando Invitational quarterfinals	L 51–62	3–2	17 – Mitchell	6 – Tied	2 – Tied	HP Field House (1,979); Bay Lake, FL
November 29, 2019*; 1:00 pm, ESPNews		vs. Temple; Orlando Invitational consolation 2nd round	L 42–65	3–3	12 – Nebo	6 – Nebo	3 – Chandler	HP Field House (2,014); Bay Lake, FL
December 1, 2019*; 9:30 am, ESPNU		vs. Fairfield; Orlando Invitational 7th place game	L 62–67	3–4	17 – Flagg	5 – Gultekin	5 – Jackson	HP Field House; Bay Lake, FL
December 8, 2019*; 2:00 pm, ABC		vs. Texas; Lone Star Showdown	L 50–60	3–5	16 – Nebo	14 – Miller	5 – French	Dickies Arena (9,136); Fort Worth, TX
December 15, 2019*; 5:00 pm, SECN+		Texas A&M–Corpus Christi	W 63–60	4–5	20 – Miller	13 – Nebo	4 – Flagg	Reed Arena (5,846); College Station, TX
December 21, 2019*; 7:30 pm, SECN		Oregon State	W 64–49	5–5	15 – Nebo	13 – Miller	3 – Chandler	Reed Arena (7,303); College Station, TX
December 30, 2019*; 7:00 pm, SECN+		Texas Southern	W 58–55	6–5	18 – Flagg	15 – Nebo	3 – 3 tied	Reed Arena (6,588); College Station, TX
January 4, 2020; 6:00 pm, SECN		at Arkansas	L 59–69	6–6 (0–1)	15 – Gordon	13 – Nebo	3 – Gordon	Bud Walton Arena (19,200); Fayetteville, AR
January 7, 2020; 8:00 pm, SECN		Ole Miss	W 57–47	7–6 (1–1)	17 – Nebo	9 – Tied	3 – Flagg	Reed Arena (5,982); College Station, TX
January 11, 2020; 2:30 pm, SECN		at Vanderbilt	W 69–50	8–6 (2–1)	15 – Mitchell	7 – Tied	4 – Flagg	Memorial Gymnasium (9,076); Nashville, TN
January 14, 2020; 6:00 pm, SECN		LSU	L 85–89 ^{OT}	8–7 (2–2)	20 – Nebo	9 – Nebo	4 – Flagg	Reed Arena (7,068); College Station, TX
January 18, 2020; 12:00 pm, SECN		South Carolina	L 67–81	8–8 (2–3)	18 – Nebo	9 – Miller	4 – Flagg	Reed Arena (7,466); College Station, TX
January 21, 2020; 8:00 pm, ESPNU		at Missouri	W 66–64	9–8 (3–3)	14 – Flagg	6 – Flagg	2 – Flagg	Mizzou Arena (8,529); Columbia, MO
January 25, 2020*; 3:00 pm, ESPNU		Oklahoma State; Big 12/SEC Challenge	L 62–73	9–9	11 – Tied	7 – Flagg	5 – Flagg	Reed Arena (7,622); College Station, TX
January 28, 2020; 5:30 pm, SECN		at Tennessee	W 63–58	10–9 (4–3)	23 – Mitchell	12 – Miller	3 – Flagg	Thompson–Boling Arena (17,722); Knoxville, TN
February 1, 2020; 12:00 pm, SECN		at Georgia	L 48–63	10–10 (4–4)	13 – Mitchell	7 – Flagg	4 – Flagg	Stegeman Coliseum (10,156); Athens, GA
February 4, 2020; 8:00 pm, SECN		Missouri	W 68–51	11–10 (5–4)	18 – Nebo	13 – Miller	3 – Jackson	Reed Arena (5,755); College Station, TX
February 8, 2020; 12:00 pm, SECN		at South Carolina	L 54–74	11–11 (5–5)	16 – Jackson	8 – Miller	1 – 5 tied	Colonial Life Arena (13,388); Columbia, SC
February 12, 2020; 7:30 pm, SECN		Florida	L 61–78	11–12 (5–6)	19 – Miller	4 – Tied	2 – Tied	Reed Arena (6,237); College Station, TX
February 15, 2020; 2:30 pm, SECN		Georgia	W 74–69	12–12 (6–6)	21 – Miller	10 – Miller	4 – Flagg	Reed Arena (7,106); College Station, TX
February 19, 2020; 6:00 pm, SECN		at Alabama	W 74–68	13–12 (7–6)	20 – Jackson	8 – Nebo	4 – Mitchell	Coleman Coliseum (9,157); Tuscaloosa, AL
February 22, 2020; 2:30 pm, SECN		Mississippi State	W 87–75	14–12 (8–6)	21 – Nebo	10 – Flagg	3 – Tied	Reed Arena (8,122); College Station, TX
February 25, 2020; 6:00 pm, ESPN		No. 8 Kentucky	L 60–69	14–13 (8–7)	18 – Mitchell	4 – Tied	5 – Flagg	Reed Arena (8,190); College Station, TX
February 29, 2020; 11:00 am, ESPN2		at LSU	L 50–64	14–14 (8–8)	17 – Flagg	8 – Nebo	4 – Mitchell	Pete Maravich Assembly Center (13,215); Baton Rouge, LA
March 4, 2020; 6:00 pm, ESPN2		at No. 17 Auburn	W 78–75	15–14 (9–8)	19 – Nebo	7 – Tied	4 – Mitchell	Auburn Arena (9,121); Auburn, AL
March 7, 2020; 3:30 pm, SECN		Arkansas	W 77–69	16–14 (10–8)	25 – Mitchell	10 – Miller	4 – Flagg	Reed Arena (8,443); College Station, TX
SEC tournament
March 12, 2020; 6:00 pm, SECN	(7)	vs. (10) Missouri; Second round	Cancelled due to the 2020 coronavirus outbreak					Bridgestone Arena; Nashville, TN
*Non-conference game. ^{#}Rankings from AP Poll. (#) Tournament seedings in parentheses. All times are in Central Time.
