= 2019–20 Mississippi State Bulldogs men's basketball team =

American college basketball season

2019–20 Mississippi State Bulldogs men's basketball
- Conference: Southeastern Conference
- Record: 20–11 (11–7 SEC)
- Head coach: Ben Howland (5th season)
- Assistant coaches: George Brooks; Korey McCray; Ernie Zeigler
- Home arena: Humphrey Coliseum

2019–20 Southeastern Conference men's basketball standings
	Conf.				Overall
Team	W		L	PCT	W		L	PCT
No. 8 Kentucky	15	–	3	.833	25	–	6	.806
No. 20 Auburn	12	–	6	.667	25	–	6	.806
LSU	12	–	6	.667	21	–	10	.677
Mississippi State	11	–	7	.611	20	–	11	.645
Florida	11	–	7	.611	19	–	12	.613
South Carolina	10	–	8	.556	18	–	13	.581
Texas A&M	10	–	8	.556	16	–	14	.533
Tennessee	9	–	9	.500	17	–	14	.548
Alabama	8	–	10	.444	16	–	15	.516
Arkansas	7	–	11	.389	20	–	12	.625
Missouri	7	–	11	.389	15	–	16	.484
Ole Miss	6	–	12	.333	15	–	17	.469
Georgia	5	–	13	.278	16	–	16	.500
Vanderbilt	3	–	15	.167	11	–	21	.344
Note: The 2020 SEC tournament was canceled after the first round due to the COVID-19 pandemic. Rankings from AP poll

The 2019–20 Mississippi State Bulldogs basketball team represented Mississippi State University in the 2019–20 NCAA Division I men's basketball season. The Bulldogs, led by fifth-year head coach Ben Howland, played their home games at Humphrey Coliseum in Starkville, Mississippi as members of the Southeastern Conference. They finished the season 20–11, 11–7 in SEC play to finish in a tie for fourth place. They were set to be the No. 4 seed in the SEC tournament with a bye to the quarterfinals. However, the SEC Tournament and all other postseason tournaments were cancelled amid the COVID-19 pandemic.

== Previous season ==
The Bulldogs finished the 2018–19 season 23–11, 10–8 in SEC play to finish in a tie for sixth place. They defeated Texas A&M in the second round of the SEC tournament before losing in the quarterfinals to Tennessee. They were received an at-large bid to the NCAA tournament where were defeated by Liberty in the first round.

== Offseason ==
=== Departures ===
Name	Number	Pos.	Height	Weight	Year	Hometown	Reason for departure
Lamar Peters	2	G	6'0"	185	Junior	New Orleans, LA	Play professionally
T. J. Gray	4	G	6'0"	165	Junior	Columbus, MS	Walk-on; left the team for personal reasons
Quinndary Weatherspoon	11	G	6'4"	205	Senior	Camden, MS	Graduated
Aric Holman	35	F	6'10"	225	Senior	Owensboro, KY	Graduated
Jethro Tshisumpa	42	F	6'10"	260	Junior	Lubumbashi, Congo	Transferred to Texas Southern

=== Incoming transfers ===
Name	Number	Pos.	Height	Weight	Year	Hometown	Previous School
Tolu Smith	35	F	6'10"	240	Sophomore	Bay St. Louis, MS	Transferred from Western Kentucky. Under NCAA transfer rules, Smith will have to sit out for the 2019–20 season. Will have two years of remaining eligibility.

=== 2019 recruiting class ===
College recruiting information
Name	Hometown	School	Height	Weight	Commit date
Elias King; PF	Atlanta, GA	Lincoln Academy	6 ft 8 in (2.03 m)	195 lb (88 kg)	Oct 28, 2018
Elias King; PF	Recruit ratings: Scout: Rivals: 247Sports: ESPN:				
Iverson Molinar; SG	Panama City, Panama	Veritas Prep	6 ft 4 in (1.93 m)	190 lb (86 kg)	Oct 22, 2018
Iverson Molinar; SG	Recruit ratings: Scout: Rivals: 247Sports: ESPN:				
Devin Butts; SG	Macon, GA	Stratford Academy	6 ft 3 in (1.91 m)	148 lb (67 kg)	Oct 10, 2018
Devin Butts; SG	Recruit ratings: Scout: Rivals: 247Sports: ESPN:				
Quinten Post; C	Amsterdam, Netherlands	Cartesius Lyceum	7 ft 0 in (2.13 m)	244 lb (111 kg)	Jun 7, 2019
Quinten Post; C	Recruit ratings: Scout: Rivals: 247Sports: ESPN:				
Overall recruit ranking:
Note: In many cases, Scout, Rivals, 247Sports, On3, and ESPN may conflict in their listings of height and weight.; In these cases, the average was taken. ESPN grades are on a 100-point scale.; Sources: "Mississippi State 2019 Basketball Commitments". Rivals.; "2019 Mississippi State Basketball Commits". Scout.; "ESPN". ESPN.; "Scout.com Team Recruiting Rankings". Scout.; "2019 Team Ranking". Rivals.

=== 2020 Recruiting class ===
College recruiting information (2020)
Name	Hometown	School	Height	Weight	Commit date
Bayron Matos-Garcia; C	Chattanooga, TN	Hamilton Heights Christian Academy	6 ft 8 in (2.03 m)	240 lb (110 kg)	Oct 28, 2018
Bayron Matos-Garcia; C	Recruit ratings: Scout: Rivals: 247Sports: ESPN:				
Overall recruit ranking:
Note: In many cases, Scout, Rivals, 247Sports, On3, and ESPN may conflict in their listings of height and weight.; In these cases, the average was taken. ESPN grades are on a 100-point scale.; Sources: "Mississippi State 2020 Basketball Commitments". Rivals.; "2020 Mississippi State Basketball Commits". Scout.; "ESPN". ESPN.; "Scout.com Team Recruiting Rankings". Scout.; "2020 Team Ranking". Rivals.

== Preseason ==
=== SEC media poll ===
The SEC media poll was released on October 15, 2019.

Media poll
Predicted finish	Team
1	Kentucky
2	Florida
3	LSU
4	Auburn
5	Tennessee
6	Alabama
7	Mississippi State
8	Ole Miss
9	Georgia
10	South Carolina
11	Arkansas
12	Texas A&M
13	Missouri
14	Vanderbilt

=== Preseason All-SEC teams ===
The Bulldogs had one player selected to the preseason all-SEC teams.

First Team

Reggie Perry

== Roster ==
2019–20 Mississippi State Bulldogs men's basketball team
Players
Coaches

Pos.	#	Name	Height	Weight	Year	Previous school	Hometown
G	0	Nick Weatherspoon	6 ft 2 in (1.88 m)	185 lb (84 kg)	Jr	Velma Jackson HS	Canton, MS
F	1	Reggie Perry	6 ft 10 in (2.08 m)	250 lb (113 kg)	So	Thomasville HS	Thomasville, GA
F	2	Elias King	6 ft 8 in (2.03 m)	205 lb (93 kg)	Fr	Lincoln Academy	Atlanta, GA
G	3	D. J. Stewart Jr.	6 ft 6 in (1.98 m)	205 lb (93 kg)	RS Fr	Riverside HS	Grace, MS
G	4	Devin Butts	6 ft 5 in (1.96 m)	175 lb (79 kg)	Fr	Stratford Academy	Macon, GA
G	5	Iverson Molinar	6 ft 3 in (1.91 m)	195 lb (88 kg)	Fr	Veritas Prep	Panama City, Panama
G	10	Tate Clayton (W)	6 ft 2 in (1.88 m)	170 lb (77 kg)	Jr	Tupelo HS	Tupelo, MS
G	12	Robert Woodard II	6 ft 7 in (2.01 m)	235 lb (107 kg)	So	Columbus HS	Columbus, MS
G	13	Reggie Miller (W)	6 ft 5 in (1.96 m)	185 lb (84 kg)	Sr	Saltillo HS; Itawamba CC	Saltillo, MS
F	15	Prince Oduro	6 ft 8 in (2.03 m)	250 lb (113 kg)	RS So	First Love Christian Academy; Siena	Toronto, ON
F	20	Mitchell Storm (W)	6 ft 7 in (2.01 m)	200 lb (91 kg)	Sr	Madison Central HS; East Mississippi CC	Madison, MS
G	21	Justin Ramph (W)	6 ft 5 in (1.96 m)	215 lb (98 kg)	Jr	Hoover HS; Southern Union State CC	Birmingham, AL
F	22	KeyShawn Feazell	6 ft 8 in (2.03 m)	225 lb (102 kg)	Jr	Lawrence County HS	New Hebron, MS
G	23	Tyson Carter	6 ft 4 in (1.93 m)	175 lb (79 kg)	Sr	Starkville HS	Starkville, MS
F	24	Abdul Ado	6 ft 11 in (2.11 m)	255 lb (116 kg)	RS Jr	Hamilton Heights Christian Academy	Lagos, Nigeria
G	25	Isaac Stansbury (W)	6 ft 1 in (1.85 m)	160 lb (73 kg)	Fr	Greenwood HS	Bowling Green, KY
F	30	Andrew Junkin (W)	6 ft 11 in (2.11 m)	240 lb (109 kg)	RS Fr	New Hope HS	New Hope, MS
F	32	Quinten Post	7 ft 0 in (2.13 m)	225 lb (102 kg)	Fr	Cartesius Lyceum	Amsterdam, Netherlands
F	35	Tolu Smith (redshirt)	6 ft 10 in (2.08 m)	245 lb (111 kg)	So	Kahuku HS; Western Kentucky	Bay St. Louis, MS
C	45	E. J. Datcher	6 ft 10 in (2.08 m)	260 lb (118 kg)	Sr	Vincent HS	Harpersville, AL

Head coach

- Ben Howland (Weber State)

Assistant coach(es)

- George Brooks (Mississippi State)
- Korey McCray (Mercer)
- Ernie Zeigler (Cleary)

Legend

- (C) Team captain
- (S) Suspended
- (I) Ineligible
- (W) Walk-on
- Injured
- Current redshirt

Roster

== Schedule and results ==
Date time, TV	Rank^{#}	Opponent^{#}	Result	Record	High points	High rebounds	High assists	Site (attendance) city, state
Exhibition
October 27, 2019*; 3:00 pm		South Alabama; Mississippi flooding relief	W 78–75	–	19 – Carter	9 – Feazell/Perry	5 – Carter	Humphrey Coliseum (1,515); Starkville, MS
Regular season
November 5, 2019*; 7:00 pm, SECN+		FIU	W 77–69	1–0	23 – Carter	8 – Woodard II	3 – Carter, Perry	Humphrey Coliseum (6,230); Starkville, MS
November 8, 2019*; 7:00 pm, SECN+		Sam Houston State	W 67–58	2–0	28 – Carter	14 – Perry	6 – Carter	Humphrey Coliseum (6,255); Starkville, MS
November 14, 2019*; 6:00 pm, SECN		Louisiana–Monroe	W 62–45	3–0	14 – Perry	14 – Perry	4 – Carter	Humphrey Coliseum (5,582); Starkville, MS
November 17, 2019*; 2:00 pm, SECN+		New Orleans	W 82–59	4–0	21 – Woodard II	16 – Woodard II	5 – Carter	Humphrey Coliseum (6,090); Starkville, MS
November 21, 2019*; 1:00 pm, ESPNU		vs. Tulane; Myrtle Beach Invitational quarterfinal	W 80–66	5–0	21 – Molinar	11 – Carter	5 – Molinar	HTC Center; Conway, SC
November 22, 2019*; 1:30 pm, ESPN2		vs. No. 17 Villanova; Myrtle Beach Invitational semifinal	L 76–83	5–1	22 – Carter	10 – Perry	3 – Molinar	HTC Center (2,361); Conway, SC
November 24, 2019*; 12:00 pm, ESPNews		at Coastal Carolina; Myrtle Beach Invitational	W 81–56	6–1	19 – Carter	10 – Woodard II	10 – Carter	HTC Center (1,934); Conway, SC
December 5, 2019*; 7:00 pm, SECN+		Louisiana Tech	L 67–74	6–2	20 – Carter	14 – Perry	4 – Tied	Humphrey Coliseum (6,375); Starkville, MS
December 14, 2019*; 10:30 am, ESPNU		vs. Kansas State; Never Forget Tribute Classic	W 67–61	7–2	14 – Carter	10 – Woodard II	4 – Carter	Prudential Center; Newark, NJ
December 18, 2019*; 7:00 pm, SECN+		Radford	W 77–68	8–2	18 – Perry	12 – Ado	4 – Carter	Humphrey Coliseum (6,101); Starkville, MS
December 22, 2019*; 2:00 pm, SECN		vs. New Mexico State	L 52–58	8–3	17 – Perry	10 – Perry	4 – Stewart Jr.	Mississippi Coliseum (2,761); Jackson, MS
December 30, 2019*; 7:00 pm, SECN+		Kent State	W 96–68	9–3	26 – Perry	17 – Perry	4 – Tied	Humphrey Coliseum (6,515); Starkville, MS
January 4, 2020; 3:30 pm, SECN		No. 8 Auburn	L 68–80	9–4 (0–1)	21 – Perry	12 – Tied	2 – Tied	Humphrey Coliseum (8,447); Starkville, MS
January 8, 2020; 6:00 pm, SECN		at Alabama	L 69–90	9–5 (0–2)	20 – Weatherspoon	9 – Woodard II	2 – Tied	Coleman Coliseum (9,938); Tuscaloosa, AL
January 11, 2020; 7:00 pm, ESPN		at LSU	L 59–60	9–6 (0–3)	14 – Weatherspoon	15 – Perry	5 – Weatherspoon	Pete Maravich Assembly Center (10,364); Baton Rouge, LA
January 14, 2020; 8:00 pm, SECN		Missouri	W 72–45	10–6 (1–3)	23 – Perry	10 – Perry	7 – Carter	Humphrey Coliseum (5,904); Starkville, MS
January 18, 2020; 7:30 pm, SECN		Georgia	W 91–59	11–6 (2–3)	22 – Perry	12 – Perry	8 – Weatherspoon	Humphrey Coliseum (6,585); Starkville, MS
January 22, 2020; 6:00 pm, SECN		Arkansas	W 77–70	12–6 (3–3)	26 – Perry	13 – Perry	6 – Weatherspoon	Humphrey Coliseum (6,337); Starkville, MS
January 25, 2020*; 1:00 pm, ESPN2		vs. Oklahoma; Big 12/SEC Challenge	L 62–63	12–7	15 – Woodard II	8 – Stewart Jr.	2 – Weatherspoon	Chesapeake Energy Arena (6,442); Oklahoma City, OK
January 28, 2020; 6:00 pm, ESPN2		at Florida	W 78–71	13–7 (4–3)	27 – Perry	9 – Ado	8 – Weatherspoon	O'Connell Center (8,248); Gainesville, FL
February 1, 2020; 1:00 pm, ESPNU		Tennessee	W 86–73	14–7 (5–3)	24 – Perry	12 – Perry	9 – Weatherspoon	Humphrey Coliseum (8,113); Starkville, MS
February 4, 2020; 8:00 pm, ESPN		at No. 15 Kentucky	L 72–80	14–8 (5–4)	15 – Tied	11 – Ado	2 – Tied	Rupp Arena (20,115); Lexington, KY
February 8, 2020; 7:30 pm, SECN		Vanderbilt	W 80–70	15–8 (6–4)	25 – Perry	11 – Perry	6 – Perry	Humphrey Coliseum (7,642); Starkville, MS
February 11, 2020; 6:00 pm, ESPNU		at Ole Miss	L 58–83	15–9 (6–5)	24 – Perry	8 – Perry	6 – Weatherspoon	The Pavilion at Ole Miss (8,009); Oxford, MS
February 15, 2020; 12:00 pm, SECN		at Arkansas	W 78–77	16–9 (7–5)	26 – Carter	8 – Perry	3 – Weatherspoon	Bud Walton Arena (19,200); Fayetteville, AR
February 19, 2020; 8:00 pm, SECN		South Carolina	W 79–76	17–9 (8–5)	18 – Weatherspoon	10 – Perry	6 – Weatherspoon	Humphrey Coliseum (6,281); Starkville, MS
February 22, 2020; 2:30 pm, SECN		at Texas A&M	L 75–87	17–10 (8–6)	19 – Carter	8 – Perry	5 – Weatherspoon	Reed Arena (8,122); College Station, TX
February 25, 2020; 8:00 pm, SECN		Alabama	W 80–73	18–10 (9–6)	21 – Perry	12 – Perry	5 – Carter	Humphrey Coliseum (6,685); Starkville, MS
February 29, 2020; 2:30 pm, SECN		at Missouri	W 67–63	19–10 (10–6)	15 – Carter	7 – Ado	3 – Perry	Mizzou Arena (10,397); Columbia, MO
March 3, 2020; 5:30 pm, SECN		at South Carolina	L 71–83	19–11 (10–7)	24 – Carter	16 – Perry	3 – Stewart Jr.	Colonial Life Arena (10,889); Columbia, SC
March 7, 2020; 5:30 pm, SECN		Ole Miss	W 69–44	20–11 (11–7)	22 – Perry	14 – Perry	6 – Weatherspoon	Humphrey Coliseum (8,909); Starkville, MS
SEC tournament
March 13, 2020; 2:30 pm, ESPN	(4)	vs. Quarterfinals	Cancelled due to the COVID-19 pandemic					Bridgestone Arena; Nashville, TN
*Non-conference game. ^{#}Rankings from AP Poll. (#) Tournament seedings in parentheses. All times are in Central Time.
