= 2019–20 Missouri Tigers men's basketball team =

American college basketball season

2019–20 Missouri Tigers men's basketball
- Conference: Southeastern Conference
- Record: 15–16 (7–11 SEC)
- Head coach: Cuonzo Martin (3rd season)
- Assistant coaches: Chris Hollender; Cornell Mann; Marco Harris; Michael Porter Sr.
- Home arena: Mizzou Arena

2019–20 Southeastern Conference men's basketball standings
	Conf.				Overall
Team	W		L	PCT	W		L	PCT
No. 8 Kentucky	15	–	3	.833	25	–	6	.806
No. 20 Auburn	12	–	6	.667	25	–	6	.806
LSU	12	–	6	.667	21	–	10	.677
Mississippi State	11	–	7	.611	20	–	11	.645
Florida	11	–	7	.611	19	–	12	.613
South Carolina	10	–	8	.556	18	–	13	.581
Texas A&M	10	–	8	.556	16	–	14	.533
Tennessee	9	–	9	.500	17	–	14	.548
Alabama	8	–	10	.444	16	–	15	.516
Arkansas	7	–	11	.389	20	–	12	.625
Missouri	7	–	11	.389	15	–	16	.484
Ole Miss	6	–	12	.333	15	–	17	.469
Georgia	5	–	13	.278	16	–	16	.500
Vanderbilt	3	–	15	.167	11	–	21	.344
Note: The 2020 SEC tournament was canceled after the first round due to the COVID-19 pandemic. Rankings from AP poll

The 2019–20 Missouri Tigers men's basketball team represented the University of Missouri in the 2019–20 NCAA Division I men's basketball season and was led by head coach Cuonzo Martin, who was in his third year at Missouri. The team played its home games at Mizzou Arena in Columbia, Missouri as eighth-year members of the Southeastern Conference. They finished the season 15–16, 7–11 in SEC play to finish in a tie for tenth place. They were set to take on Texas A&M in the second round of the SEC tournament. However, the SEC Tournament was cancelled amid the COVID-19 pandemic.

== Previous season ==
The Tigers finished the 2018–19 season 15–17, 5–13 in SEC play to finish in 12th place. As the No. 12 seed in the SEC tournament, they defeated the Georgia Bulldogs in the first round 71–61. Missouri would lose in the second round to the number five seed Auburn. The Tigers did not receive an at-large bid or earn an automatic-bid to the NCAA tournament.

=== Departures ===
Name	Number	Pos.	Height	Weight	Year	Hometown	Notes
Jordan Geist	15	G	6'2"	180	R-Senior	Fort Wayne, IN	Graduated
Kevin Puryear	24	F	6'7"	238	Senior	Blue Springs, MO	Graduated
Adam Wolf	32	F	6'7"	219	Senior	Beaver Dam, WI	Graduated
Cullen VanLeer	33	G	6'4"	208	Senior	Pacific, MO	Graduated
Jontay Porter	11	F	6'11"	240	Sophomore	Columbia, MO	Declared for 2019 NBA draft
Christian Guess	55	G	6'5"	180	Freshman	Cleveland, OH	Transferring to Tallahassee Community College
Ronnie Suggs	3	G	6'6"	190	Junior	Washington, MO	Transferred to Southern Illinois
K. J. Santos	2	F	6'8"	220	Sophomore	Geneva, IL	Left to play professionally for Brujos de Guayama

=== 2019 recruiting class ===
College recruiting information
Name	Hometown	School	Height	Weight	Commit date
LaTrayvion Jackson; PF	Ypsilanti, Michigan	Sunrise Christian Academy	6 ft 8 in (2.03 m)	200 lb (91 kg)	Nov 14, 2018
LaTrayvion Jackson; PF	Recruit ratings: Rivals: 247Sports: ESPN: (86)				
Mario McKinney Jr. PG	St. Louis, Missouri	Vashon High School	6 ft 2 in (1.88 m)	180 lb (82 kg)	Sep 24, 2018
Mario McKinney Jr. PG	Recruit ratings: Rivals: 247Sports: ESPN: (81)				
Kobe Brown; SF	Huntsville, AL	Lee High School	6 ft 7 in (2.01 m)	220 lb (100 kg)	May 14, 2019
Kobe Brown; SF	Recruit ratings: Rivals: 247Sports: ESPN: (82)				
Overall recruit ranking:
Note: In many cases, Scout, Rivals, 247Sports, On3, and ESPN may conflict in their listings of height and weight.; In these cases, the average was taken. ESPN grades are on a 100-point scale.; Sources:

=== Incoming transfers ===
Name	Number	Pos.	Height	Weight	Year	Hometown	Notes
Axel Okongo	15	C	7'0"	240	Junior	Saâcy-sur-Marne, France	Transfer from Northwest College

== Preseason ==
=== SEC media poll ===
The SEC media poll was released on October 15, 2019.

Media poll
Predicted finish	Team
1	Kentucky
2	Florida
3	LSU
4	Auburn
5	Tennessee
6	Alabama
7	Mississippi State
8	Ole Miss
9	Georgia
10	South Carolina
11	Arkansas
12	Texas A&M
13	Missouri
14	Vanderbilt

== Roster ==
2019–20 Missouri Tigers men's basketball team
Players
Coaches

Pos.	#	Name	Height	Weight	Year	Previous school	Hometown
G	0	Torrence Watson	6 ft 5 in (1.96 m)	205 lb (93 kg)	So	Whitfield School	St. Louis, MO
G	1	Xavier Pinson	6 ft 2 in (1.88 m)	170 lb (77 kg)	So	Simeon Career Academy	Chicago, IL
F	2	LaTrayvion Jackson	6 ft 8 in (2.03 m)	215 lb (98 kg)	Fr	Sunrise Christian Academy	Ypsilanti, MI
G	4	Javon Pickett	6 ft 5 in (1.96 m)	220 lb (100 kg)	So	Belleville East High School	Belleville, IL
F	5	Mitchell Smith	6 ft 10 in (2.08 m)	221 lb (100 kg)	RS Jr	Van Buren High School	Van Buren, AR
G	10	Evan Yerkes (W)	6 ft 3 in (1.91 m)	187 lb (85 kg)	So	Victor J. Andrew High School	Tinley Park, IL
G	11	Mario McKinney Jr. (S)	6 ft 2 in (1.88 m)	185 lb (84 kg)	Fr	Vashon High School	St. Louis, MO
G	12	Dru Smith	6 ft 3 in (1.91 m)	203 lb (92 kg)	RS Jr	Reitz Memorial High School; Evansville	Evansville, IN
G	13	Mark Smith	6 ft 5 in (1.96 m)	220 lb (100 kg)	Jr	Edwardsville High School; Illinois	Edwardsville, IL
C	14	Reed Nikko	6 ft 10 in (2.08 m)	240 lb (109 kg)	Sr	Maple Grove High School	Maple Grove, MN
F	15	Axel Okongo	7 ft 0 in (2.13 m)	250 lb (113 kg)	Jr	Thetford Prep; Northwest College (WY)	Saâcy-sur-Marne, France
C	23	Jeremiah Tilmon	6 ft 10 in (2.08 m)	260 lb (118 kg)	Jr	East St. Louis High School	East St. Louis, IL
F	24	Kobe Brown	6 ft 7 in (2.01 m)	240 lb (109 kg)	Fr	Lee High School	Huntsville, AL
G	25	Brooks Ford (W)	6 ft 0 in (1.83 m)	187 lb (85 kg)	So	De Smit High School	St. Louis, MO
F	42	Parker Braun	6 ft 8 in (2.03 m)	217 lb (98 kg)	RS Fr	Blue Valley Northwest High School	Overland Park, KS

Head coach

- Cuonzo Martin (Purdue)

Assistant coach(es)

- Chris Hollender (Evansville)
- Cornell Mann (Akron)
- Michael Porter Sr. (New Orleans)
- Marco Hariss (Southwestern Oklahoma State)

Legend

- (C) Team captain
- (S) Suspended
- (I) Ineligible
- (W) Walk-on
- Injured
- Current redshirt

Roster
Last update: May 1, 2019

On January 11, 2020, Martin announced that the Tigers had suspended freshman Mario McKinney indefinitely for unspecified reasons.

== Schedule and results ==
Date time, TV	Rank^{#}	Opponent^{#}	Result	Record	High points	High rebounds	High assists	Site (attendance) city, state
Exhibition
November 1, 2019*; 7:00 pm, SECN+		Central Missouri	W 80–56		12 – Brown	7 – M. Smith	7 – D. Smith	Mizzou Arena (7,072); Columbia, MO
Regular season
November 6, 2019*; 7:00 pm, SECN+		Incarnate Word	W 82–42	1–0	16 – Tilmon	8 – Pickett	5 – Pinson, D. Smith	Mizzou Arena (8,185); Columbia, MO
November 8, 2019*; 7:00 pm, SECN+		Northern Kentucky	W 71–56	2–0	19 – Ma. Smith	7 – Mi. Smith	6 – Pinson	Mizzou Arena (8,486); Columbia, MO
November 12, 2019*; 6:00 pm, CBSSN		at No. 21 Xavier	L 58–63 ^{OT}	2–1	22 – D. Smith	10 – D. Smith	4 – D. Smith	Cintas Center (10,224); Cincinnati, OH
November 18, 2019*; 7:00 pm, SECN+		Wofford; Hall of Fame Classic campus-site game	W 75–56	3–1	19 – Ma. Smith	5 – Tilmon	7 – D. Smith	Mizzou Arena (8,144); Columbia, MO
November 20, 2019*; 7:00 pm, SECN+		Morehead State; Hall of Fame Classic campus-site game	W 70–52	4–1	21 – Ma. Smith	9 – D. Smith	5 – D. Smith	Mizzou Arena (8,142); Columbia, MO
November 25, 2019*; 6:00 pm, ESPNU		vs. Butler; Hall of Fame Classic semifinals	L 52–63	4–2	19 – D. Smith	4 – Mi. Smith	3 – Pinson	Sprint Center (8,963); Kansas City, MO
November 26, 2019*; 6:00 pm, ESPNews		vs. Oklahoma; Hall of Fame Classic third place game	L 66–77	4–3	18 – Ma. Smith	8 – Ma. Smith	7 – D. Smith	Sprint Center (8,506); Kansas City, MO
December 3, 2019*; 7:00 pm, SECN+		Charleston Southern	L 60–68	4–4	15 – Tilmon	9 – Tilmon	4 – D. Smith	Mizzou Arena (7,894); Columbia, MO
December 7, 2019*; 6:30 pm, ESPNU		at Temple	W 64–54	5–4	16 – Pickett	6 – Ma. Smith, D. Smith	3 – D. Smith, Pinson	Liacouras Center (6,405); Philadelphia, PA
December 15, 2019*; 3:00 pm, SECN		Southern Illinois	W 64–48	6–4	23 – Ma. Smith	8 – D. Smith	3 – Pinson	Mizzou Arena (8,216); Columbia, MO
December 21, 2019*; 12:00 pm, SECN		vs. Illinois; Braggin' Rights	W 63–56	7–4	19 – D. Smith	6 – Mi. Smith, Pickett	4 – D. Smith	Enterprise Center (15,259); St. Louis, MO
December 30, 2019*; 7:00 pm, SECN+		Chicago State	W 91–33	8–4	24 – Watson	6 – Brown	7 – Smith	Mizzou Arena (9,359); Columbia, MO
January 4, 2020; 1:00 pm, SECN		at No. 17 Kentucky	L 59–71	8–5 (0–1)	11 – D. Smith	3 – Tied	2 – Tied	Rupp Arena (20,396); Lexington, KY
January 7, 2020; 6:00 pm, SECN		Tennessee	L 59–69	8–6 (0–2)	11 – Jackson	7 – Mi. Smith	4 – Tied	Mizzou Arena (8,663); Columbia, MO
January 11, 2020; 7:30 pm, SECN		Florida	W 91–75	9–6 (1–2)	22 – D. Smith	6 – Ma. Smith	6 – D. Smith	Mizzou Arena (9,001); Columbia, MO
January 14, 2020; 8:00 pm, SECN		at Mississippi State	L 45–72	9–7 (1–3)	14 – Brown	4 – Tied	3 – Tied	Humphrey Coliseum (5,904); Starkville, MS
January 18, 2020; 2:30 pm, SECN		at Alabama	L 74–88	9–8 (1–4)	18 – D. Smith	6 – Tied	2 – Tied	Coleman Coliseum (10,950); Tuscaloosa, AL
January 21, 2020; 8:00 pm, ESPNU		Texas A&M	L 64–66	9–9 (1–5)	19 – Ma. Smith	11 – Mi. Smith	8 – D. Smith	Mizzou Arena (8,529); Columbia, MO
January 25, 2020*; 11:00 am, ESPN		at No. 14 West Virginia; Big 12/SEC Challenge	L 51–74	9–10	19 – Watson	5 – Tied	2 – Tied	WVU Coliseum (14,031); Morgantown, WV
January 28, 2020; 7:30 pm, SECN		Georgia	W 72–69	10–10 (2–5)	16 – Tied	7 – Mi. Smith	3 – Tied	Mizzou Arena (8,451); Columbia, MO
February 1, 2020; 2:30 pm, SECN		at South Carolina	L 54–76	10–11 (2–6)	12 – Pinson	8 – Pickett	3 – D. Smith	Colonial Life Arena (14,678); Columbia, SC
February 4, 2020; 8:00 pm, SECN		at Texas A&M	L 51–68	10–12 (2–7)	9 – Mi. Smith	11 – Mi. Smith	7 – D. Smith	Reed Arena (5,755); College Station, TX
February 8, 2020; 2:30 pm, SECN		Arkansas	W 83–79 ^{OT}	11–12 (3–7)	24 – Pinson	11 – Tied	3 – Pinson	Mizzou Arena (11,439); Columbia, SC
February 11, 2020; 8:00 pm, SECN		at No. 25 LSU	L 78–82	11–13 (13–8)	20 – D. Smith	8 – Nikko	7 – Pinson	Pete Maravich Assembly Center (10,990); Baton Rouge, LA
February 15, 2020; 5:00 pm, ESPN2		No. 11 Auburn	W 85–73	12–13 (4–8)	28 – Tied	9 – Brown	5 – Pinson	Mizzou Arena (12,506); Columbia, MO
February 18, 2020; 7:30 pm, SECN		Ole Miss	W 71–68	13–13 (5–8)	32 – Pinson	7 – Braun	4 – D. Smith	Mizzou Arena (8,677); Columbia, MO
February 22, 2020; 12:00 pm, SECN		at Arkansas	L 68–78	13–14 (5–9)	17 – Brown	10 – Brown	7 – Pinson	Bud Walton Arena (19,200); Fayetteville, AR
February 26, 2020; 8:00 pm, ESPNU		at Vanderbilt	W 61–52	14–14 (6–9)	17 – Pinson	12 – Mi. Smith	3 – D. Smith	Memorial Gymnasium (8,497); Nashville, TN
February 29, 2020; 2:30 pm, SECN		Mississippi State	L 63–67	14–15 (6–10)	20 – Pinson	9 – D. Smith	2 – Tied	Mizzou Arena (10,397); Columbia, MO
March 4, 2020; 8:00 pm, SECN		at Ole Miss	L 67-75	14-16 (6-11)	16 – Pinson	7 – Tilmon	5 – Pinson	The Pavilion at Ole Miss (6,887); Oxford, MS
March 7, 2020; 1:30 pm, SECN		Alabama	W 69-50	15-16 (7-11)	17 – D. Smith	9 – Tilmon	8 – D. Smith	Mizzou Arena (10,047); Columbia, MO
SEC tournament
March 12, 2020; 6:00 pm, SECN	(10)	vs. (7) Texas A&M; Second round	Cancelled due to the COVID-19 pandemic					Bridgestone Arena; Nashville, TN
*Non-conference game. ^{#}Rankings from AP Poll. (#) Tournament seedings in parentheses. All times are in Central Time.

== Rankings ==
Ranking movements Legend: ██ Increase in ranking ██ Decrease in ranking — = Not ranked RV = Received votes
	Week																			
Poll	Pre	1	2	3	4	5	6	7	8	9	10	11	12	13	14	15	16	17	18	Final
AP	RV	RV	RV	RV																Not released
Coaches	—	—	RV	—																

*AP does not release post-NCAA Tournament rankings
