= 2019–20 Alabama Crimson Tide men's basketball team =

American college basketball season

2019–20 Alabama Crimson Tide men's basketball
- Conference: Southeastern Conference
- Record: 16–15 (8–10 SEC)
- Head coach: Nate Oats (1st season)
- Assistant coaches: Bryan Hodgson (1st season); Antoine Pettway (8th season); Charlie Henry (1st season)
- Home arena: Coleman Coliseum

2019–20 Southeastern Conference men's basketball standings
	Conf.				Overall
Team	W		L	PCT	W		L	PCT
No. 8 Kentucky	15	–	3	.833	25	–	6	.806
No. 20 Auburn	12	–	6	.667	25	–	6	.806
LSU	12	–	6	.667	21	–	10	.677
Mississippi State	11	–	7	.611	20	–	11	.645
Florida	11	–	7	.611	19	–	12	.613
South Carolina	10	–	8	.556	18	–	13	.581
Texas A&M	10	–	8	.556	16	–	14	.533
Tennessee	9	–	9	.500	17	–	14	.548
Alabama	8	–	10	.444	16	–	15	.516
Arkansas	7	–	11	.389	20	–	12	.625
Missouri	7	–	11	.389	15	–	16	.484
Ole Miss	6	–	12	.333	15	–	17	.469
Georgia	5	–	13	.278	16	–	16	.500
Vanderbilt	3	–	15	.167	11	–	21	.344
Note: The 2020 SEC tournament was canceled after the first round due to the COVID-19 pandemic. Rankings from AP poll

The 2019–20 Alabama Crimson Tide men's basketball team represented the University of Alabama in the 2019–20 NCAA Division I men's basketball season. The team was led by first-year head coach Nate Oats, The Crimson Tide played their home games at Coleman Coliseum in Tuscaloosa, Alabama as a member of the Southeastern Conference. They finished the season 16–15, 8–10 in SEC play to finish in ninth place. They were set to take on Tennessee in the second round of the SEC tournament. However, they remainder of the SEC Tournament was cancelled amid the COVID-19 pandemic.

== Previous season ==
The Crimson Tide finished the 2018–19 season 18–16, 8–10 to finish in eighth place in SEC play. They defeated Ole Miss to advance to the quarterfinals of the SEC tournament where they lost to Kentucky. They received a bid to the National Invitational Tournament where they lost in the first round to Norfolk State.

== Offseason ==
It was announced on March 24, 2019, that the University of Alabama and Head Coach Avery Johnson had mutually agreed to part ways after four seasons. Johnson's contract was supposed to run through the 2023 season and would have paid him $2.9 Million. On March 27, 2019, the school hired Buffalo head coach Nate Oats as the school's new coach.

Guard Dazon Ingram announced that he would be transfer.

=== Departures ===
Name	Number	Pos.	Height	Weight	Year	Hometown	Reason for departure
Daniel Giddens	4	F/C	6'11"	247	RS Junior	Mableton, GA	Graduate transferred to Vermont
Dazon Ingram	12	G	6'5"	207	RS Junior	Theodore, AL	Graduate transferred to UCF
Diante Wood	22	G	6'4"	175	Freshman	Anniston, AL	Transferred to Jacksonville
Lawson Schaffer	24	G	5'11"	168	Senior	Cullman, AL	Walk-on; graduated
Tevin Mack	34	G/F	6'7"	223	RS Junior	Columbia, SC	Graduate transferred to Clemson

=== Incoming transfers ===
Name	Number	Pos.	Height	Weight	Year	Hometown	Previous School
James Bolden	11	G	6'0"	188	RS Junior	Covington, KY	Transferred from West Virginia. Will eligible to play immediately since Bolden graduated from West Virginia.
Jahvon Quinerly	13	G	6'1"	175	Freshman	Hackensack, NJ	Transferred from Villanova. Will redshirt the 2019–20 season under NCAA transfer rules and have three years of eligibility at the start of the 2020–21 season.

== Recruits ==
=== 2019–20 team recruits ===
College recruiting information
Name	Hometown	School	Height	Weight	Commit date
Juwan Gary; SF	Charlotte, NC	West Charlotte High School	6 ft 5 in (1.96 m)	190 lb (86 kg)	Jul 13, 2018
Juwan Gary; SF	Recruit ratings: Rivals: 247Sports: ESPN: (87)				
Jaylen Forbes; SG	Florence, MS	Florence High School	6 ft 4 in (1.93 m)	180 lb (82 kg)	Aug 2, 2018
Jaylen Forbes; SG	Recruit ratings: Rivals: 247Sports: ESPN: (84)				
Jaden Shackelford; PG	Hesperia, CA	Hesperia High School	6 ft 2 in (1.88 m)	185 lb (84 kg)	Sep 29, 2018
Jaden Shackelford; PG	Recruit ratings: Rivals: 247Sports: ESPN: (83)				
Raymond Hawkins; C	Oakland, CA	Findlay Prep (NV)	6 ft 10 in (2.08 m)	220 lb (100 kg)	Mar 30, 2019
Raymond Hawkins; C	Recruit ratings: Rivals: 247Sports: ESPN: (80)				
James Rojas; PF	Jamestown, NY	Hutchinson Community College (JC)	6 ft 8 in (2.03 m)	215 lb (98 kg)	May 21, 2019
James Rojas; PF	Recruit ratings: Rivals: 247Sports: ESPN: (NR)				
Overall recruit ranking:
Note: In many cases, Scout, Rivals, 247Sports, On3, and ESPN may conflict in their listings of height and weight.; In these cases, the average was taken. ESPN grades are on a 100-point scale.; Sources: "2019 Alabama Commits". Rivals.; "ESPN- Alabama Crimson Tide Men's Basketball Recruiting". ESPN.; "2019 Team Ranking". Rivals.

== Preseason ==
=== SEC media poll ===
The SEC media poll was released on October 15, 2019.

Media poll
Predicted finish	Team
1	Kentucky
2	Florida
3	LSU
4	Auburn
5	Tennessee
6	Alabama
7	Mississippi State
8	Ole Miss
9	Georgia
10	South Carolina
11	Arkansas
12	Texas A&M
13	Missouri
14	Vanderbilt

=== Preseason All-SEC teams ===
The Crimson Tide had one player selected to the preseason all-SEC teams.

Second Team

Kira Lewis Jr.

== Roster ==
2019–20 Alabama Crimson Tide men's basketball team
Players
Coaches

Pos.	#	Name	Height	Weight	Year	Previous school	Hometown
F	0	Javian Davis	6 ft 9 in (2.06 m)	242 lb (110 kg)	So	Canton HS	Canton, MS
G/F	1	Herbert Jones	6 ft 7 in (2.01 m)	205 lb (93 kg)	Jr	Hale County HS	Greensboro, AL
G	2	Kira Lewis Jr.	6 ft 3 in (1.91 m)	165 lb (75 kg)	So	Hazel Green HS	Meridianville, AL
F	3	Alex Reese	6 ft 9 in (2.06 m)	245 lb (111 kg)	Jr	Pelham HS	Pelham, AL
F	4	Juwan Gary (injured)	6 ft 5 in (1.96 m)	215 lb (98 kg)	Fr	West Charlotte HS	Charlotte, NC
G	5	Jaden Shackelford	6 ft 3 in (1.91 m)	195 lb (88 kg)	Fr	Hesperia HS	Hesperia, CA
G	11	James Bolden	6 ft 0 in (1.83 m)	160 lb (73 kg)	GS	West Virginia	Covington, KY
G	12	Jaylen Forbes	6 ft 4 in (1.93 m)	186 lb (84 kg)	Fr	Florence HS	Florence, MS
G	13	Jahvon Quinerly (redshirt)	6 ft 1 in (1.85 m)	175 lb (79 kg)	So	Villanova	Hackensack, NJ
F	15	Tyler Barnes (W)	6 ft 8 in (2.03 m)	201 lb (91 kg)	Jr	St. Xavier HS	Louisville, KY
G	21	Britton Johnson (W)	6 ft 4 in (1.93 m)	183 lb (83 kg)	So	Mountain Brook HS	Mountain Brook, AL
G	23	John Petty Jr.	6 ft 5 in (1.96 m)	184 lb (83 kg)	Jr	Jemison HS	Huntsville, AL
F	30	Galin Smith	6 ft 9 in (2.06 m)	240 lb (109 kg)	Jr	Clinton HS	Clinton, MS
F	33	James Rojas (injured)	6 ft 8 in (2.03 m)	215 lb (98 kg)	Jr	Hutchinson CC (JC)	Jamestown, NY
F/C	35	Raymond Hawkins	6 ft 9 in (2.06 m)	240 lb (109 kg)	Fr	Findlay Prep (NV)	Oakland, CA

Head coach

- Nate Oats

Assistant coach(es)

- Bryan Hodgson
- Antoine Pettway
- Charlie Henry

Legend

- (C) Team captain
- (S) Suspended
- (I) Ineligible
- (W) Walk-on
- Injured
- Current redshirt

Roster

== Schedule and results ==
Date time, TV	Rank^{#}	Opponent^{#}	Result	Record	High points	High rebounds	High assists	Site (attendance) city, state
Exhibition
October 27, 2019*; 12:00 pm		Georgia Tech; Charity exhibition	W 93–65	–	21 – Shackleford	7 – Tied	8 – Lewis Jr.	Coleman Coliseum (9,293); Tuscaloosa, AL
Regular season
November 5, 2019*; 7:00 pm, SECN+		Penn	L 80–81	0–1	30 – Lewis Jr.	8 – Tied	5 – Lewis Jr.	Coleman Coliseum (11,223); Tuscaloosa, AL
November 11, 2019*; 7:00 pm, SECN+		Florida Atlantic	W 78–59	1–1	19 – Davis	9 – Davis	8 – Lewis Jr.	Coleman Coliseum (9,117); Tuscaloosa, AL
November 15, 2019*; 6:30 pm, NBCSN		at Rhode Island	L 79–93	1–2	21 – Lewis Jr.	8 – Petty Jr.	4 – Tied	Ryan Center (7,021); Kingston, RI
November 19, 2019*; 7:00 pm, SECN+		Furman; Battle 4 Atlantis campus site game	W 81–73	2–2	25 – Shackelford	7 – Lewis Jr.	4 – Jones	Coleman Coliseum (8,763); Tuscaloosa, AL
November 27, 2019*; 1:00 pm, ESPN		vs. No. 6 North Carolina; Battle 4 Atlantis quarterfinal	L 67–76	2–3	23 – Petty Jr.	9 – Reese	4 – Lewis Jr.	Imperial Arena (1,405); Nassau, Bahamas
November 29, 2019*; 5:30 pm, ESPN2		vs. Iowa State; Battle 4 Atlantis consolation 2nd round	L 89–104	2–4	34 – Petty Jr.	12 – Petty Jr.	5 – Lewis Jr.	Imperial Arena (1,299); Nassau, Bahamas
November 30, 2019*; 8:30 pm, ESPNU		vs. Southern Miss; Battle 4 Atlantis 7th place game	W 83–68	3–4	23 – Bolden	8 – Petty Jr.	8 – Shackelford	Imperial Arena (1,159); Nassau, Bahamas
December 6, 2019*; 7:00 pm, SECN+		Stephen F. Austin	W 78–68	4–4	17 – Shackelford	6 – Lewis Jr.	3 – Tied	Coleman Coliseum (9,545); Tuscaloosa, AL
December 14, 2019*; 1:00 pm, BTN		at Penn State	L 71–73	4–5	15 – Bolden	9 – Jones	6 – Lewis Jr.	Bryce Jordan Center (7,736); University Park, PA
December 18, 2019*; 6:30 pm, ESPN+		vs. Samford; Chick-fil-A Birmingham Classic	W 105–87	5–5	39 – Petty Jr.	10 – Petty Jr.	7 – Jones	Legacy Arena (5,476); Birmingham, AL
December 21, 2019*; 2:30 pm, SECN		vs. Belmont; Rocket City Classic	W 92–72	6–5	16 – Shackelford	11 – Petty Jr.	8 – Lewis Jr.	Von Braun Center (5,712); Huntsville, AL
December 29, 2019*; 5:30 pm, SECN		Richmond	W 90–78	7–5	28 – Shackelford	10 – Jones	4 – Tied	Coleman Coliseum (9,960); Tuscaloosa, AL
January 4, 2020; 5:00 pm, ESPN2		at Florida	L 98–104 ^{2OT}	7–6 (0–1)	19 – Petty Jr.	9 – Jones	4 – Jones	O'Connell Center (9,350); Gainesville, FL
January 8, 2020; 6:00 pm, SECN		Mississippi State	W 90–69	8–6 (1–1)	18 – Petty Jr.	8 – Lewis Jr.	4 – Lewis Jr.	Coleman Coliseum (9,938); Tuscaloosa, AL
January 11, 2020; 11:00 am, ESPN		at No. 14 Kentucky	L 67–76	8–7 (1–2)	18 – Jones	8 – Lewis Jr.	4 – Tied	Rupp Arena (20,407); Lexington, KY
January 15, 2020; 8:00 pm, ESPN2		No. 4 Auburn; Iron Bowl of Basketball	W 83–64	9–7 (2–2)	25 – Lewis Jr.	12 – Jones	3 – Lewis Jr.	Coleman Coliseum (14,474); Tuscaloosa, AL
January 18, 2020; 2:30 pm, SECN		Missouri	W 88–74	10–7 (3–2)	20 – Petty Jr.	12 – Jones	7 – Lewis Jr.	Coleman Coliseum (10,950); Tuscaloosa, AL
January 22, 2020; 8:00 pm, SECN		at Vanderbilt	W 77–62	11–7 (4–2)	23 – Petty Jr.	10 – Petty Jr.	5 – Tied	Memorial Gymnasium (9,019); Nashville, TN
January 25, 2020*; 5:00 pm, ESPN2		Kansas State; Big 12/SEC Challenge	W 77–74	12–7	26 – Lewis Jr.	7 – Tied	3 – Lewis Jr.	Coleman Coliseum (11,824); Tuscaloosa, AL
January 29, 2020; 6:00 pm, ESPN2		at No. 22 LSU	L 76–90	12–8 (4–3)	21 – Shackelford	8 – Jones	8 – Lewis Jr.	Pete Maravich Assembly Center (10,871); Baton Rouge, LA
February 1, 2020; 5:00 pm, SECN		Arkansas	L 78–82	12–9 (4–4)	28 – Shackleford	9 – Tied	3 – Tied	Coleman Coliseum (12,461); Tuscaloosa, AL
February 4, 2020; 6:00 pm, ESPNU		Tennessee	L 68–69	12–10 (4–5)	19 – Lewis Jr.	11 – Petty Jr.	7 – Petty Jr.	Coleman Coliseum (9,651); Tuscaloosa, AL
February 8, 2020; 5:00 pm, SECN		at Georgia	W 105–102 ^{OT}	13–10 (5–5)	37 – Lewis Jr.	8 – Davis	7 – Lewis Jr.	Stegeman Coliseum (10,041); Georgia, GA
February 12, 2020; 6:00 pm, ESPN2		at No. 11 Auburn; Iron Bowl of Basketball	L 91–95 ^{OT}	13–11 (5–6)	28 – Shackleford	10 – Lewis Jr.	13 – Lewis Jr.	Auburn Arena (9,121); Auburn, AL
February 15, 2020; 3:00 pm, ESPN2		No. 25 LSU	W 88–82	14–11 (6–6)	27 – Lewis Jr.	17 – Jones	4 – Tied	Coleman Coliseum (12,479); Tuscaloosa, AL
February 19, 2020; 6:00 pm, SECN		Texas A&M	L 68–74	14–12 (6–7)	24 – Shackelford	5 – Jones	4 – Petty Jr.	Coleman Coliseum (9,157); Tuscaloosa, AL
February 22, 2020; 7:30 pm, SECN		at Ole Miss	W 103–78	15–12 (7–7)	21 – Petty Jr.	5 – Reese	11 – Lewis Jr.	The Pavilion at Ole Miss (8,393); Oxford, MS
February 25, 2020; 8:00 pm, SECN		at Mississippi State	L 73–80	15–13 (7–8)	29 – Lewis Jr.	9 – Shackelford	4 – Lewis Jr.	Humphrey Coliseum (6,685); Starkville, MS
February 29, 2020; 7:30 pm, SECN		South Carolina	W 90–86	16–13 (8–8)	25 – Lewis Jr.	10 – Tied	6 – Lewis Jr.	Coleman Coliseum (11,112); Tuscaloosa, AL
March 3, 2020; 7:30 pm, SECN		Vanderbilt	L 79–87	16–14 (8–9)	30 – Lewis Jr.	8 – Tied	8 – Lewis Jr.	Coleman Coliseum (9,071); Tuscaloosa, AL
March 7, 2020; 1:30 pm, SECN		at Missouri	L 50–69	16–15 (8–10)	18 – Lewis Jr.	5 – Tied	4 – Lewis Jr.	Mizzou Arena (10,047); Columbia, SC
SEC Tournament
March 12, 2020; 12:00 pm, SECN	(9)	vs. (8) Tennessee; Second round	Cancelled due to the COVID-19 pandemic					Bridgestone Arena; Nashville, TN
*Non-conference game. ^{#}Rankings from AP Poll. (#) Tournament seedings in parentheses. All times are in Central Time.
