= James Bolden (basketball) =

American basketball player (born 1996)

Lovćen 1947
- Position: Point guard
- League: Montenegrin League; ABA League Second Division

Personal information
- Born: January 16, 1996 (age 30) Covington, Kentucky, U.S.
- Listed height: 6 ft 0 in (1.83 m)
- Listed weight: 160 lb (73 kg)

Career information
- High school: Holmes (Covington, Kentucky)
- College: West Virginia (2016–2019); Alabama (2019–2020)
- NBA draft: 2020: undrafted
- Playing career: 2020–present

Career history
- 2020–present: Lovćen 1947

James "Beetle" Bolden Jr. (born January 16, 1996) is an American professional basketball player for Lovćen 1947 of the Montenegrin League and the ABA League Second Division. He played college basketball for the West Virginia Mountaineers and the Alabama Crimson Tide.

== High school career ==
Bolden attended Holmes High School in Covington, Kentucky. He averaged 18.5 points, 4.0 assists, 4.6 rebounds and 2.6 steals per game as a sophomore. As a junior, Bolden averaged 20.8 points, 3.9 rebounds, 3.4 assists and 1.8 steals per game and led the Bulldogs to the finals of the Ninth Region tournament before losing to eventual state champion Covington Catholic High School. As a senior, Bolden averaged 19.2 points, 4.8 rebounds and 3.9 assists per game. He was named to the First Team All-State for the third straight season. He finished his high school career with 2,024 career points. Bolden was ranked the No. 207 recruit in his class and committed to play college basketball for West Virginia over offers from Xavier, Butler, Purdue and Ohio.

== College career ==
Bolden redshirted his true freshman season at West Virginia after tearing his ACL and spraining his MCL. As a redshirt freshman, he averaged 3.5 points per game, shooting 44.9 percent from three-point range. Bolden averaged 8.7 points, 1.9 rebounds, and 1.1 assists per game as a sophomore. On January 12, 2019, he scored a career-high 31 points in an 85–77 loss to Oklahoma State. Bolden suffered a season-ending ankle sprain on January 26, in an 83–66 loss to Tennessee. As a redshirt junior, he averaged 12.2 points, 2.6 rebounds and 2.5 assists per game, making 12 starts. Following the season, Bolden transferred to Alabama as a graduate transfer, shortly after the hiring of coach Nate Oats. Bolden averaged 8.5 points, 2.2 rebounds and 1.2 assists per game as a graduate student.

== Professional career ==
Bolden signed with Lovćen 1947 of the Montenegrin League on August 11, 2020.

== Career statistics ==
Legend
GP	Games played	GS	Games started	MPG	Minutes per game
FG%	Field goal percentage	3P%	3-point field goal percentage	FT%	Free throw percentage
RPG	Rebounds per game	APG	Assists per game	SPG	Steals per game
BPG	Blocks per game	PPG	Points per game	**Bold**	Career high

=== College ===
Year	Team	GP	GS	MPG	FG%	3P%	FT%	RPG	APG	SPG	BPG	PPG
2015–16	West Virginia	Redshirt										
2016–17	West Virginia	27	0	5.8	**.464**	**.449**	.571	.8	.3	.3	.0	3.5
2017–18	West Virginia	**37**	3	17.2	.429	.411	**.837**	1.9	1.1	.9	**.2**	8.7
2018–19	West Virginia	18	**12**	21.4	.409	.349	.820	**2.6**	**2.5**	**1.1**	**.2**	**12.2**
2019–20	Alabama	27	3	**21.9**	.335	.344	.836	2.2	1.2	.6	.1	8.5
Career		109	18	16.2	.400	.384	.810	1.8	1.1	.7	.1	7.9
