= 2019–20 LSU Tigers basketball team =

American college basketball season

2019–20 LSU Tigers basketball
- Conference: Southeastern Conference
- Record: 21–10 (12–6 SEC)
- Head coach: Will Wade (3rd season)
- Assistant coaches: Greg Heiar; Bill Armstrong; Tasmin Mitchell
- Home arena: Pete Maravich Assembly Center

2019–20 Southeastern Conference men's basketball standings
	Conf.				Overall
Team	W		L	PCT	W		L	PCT
No. 8 Kentucky	15	–	3	.833	25	–	6	.806
No. 20 Auburn	12	–	6	.667	25	–	6	.806
LSU	12	–	6	.667	21	–	10	.677
Mississippi State	11	–	7	.611	20	–	11	.645
Florida	11	–	7	.611	19	–	12	.613
South Carolina	10	–	8	.556	18	–	13	.581
Texas A&M	10	–	8	.556	16	–	14	.533
Tennessee	9	–	9	.500	17	–	14	.548
Alabama	8	–	10	.444	16	–	15	.516
Arkansas	7	–	11	.389	20	–	12	.625
Missouri	7	–	11	.389	15	–	16	.484
Ole Miss	6	–	12	.333	15	–	17	.469
Georgia	5	–	13	.278	16	–	16	.500
Vanderbilt	3	–	15	.167	11	–	21	.344
Note: The 2020 SEC tournament was canceled after the first round due to the COVID-19 pandemic. Rankings from AP poll

The 2019–20 LSU Tigers basketball team represented Louisiana State University during the 2019–20 NCAA Division I men's basketball season. The team's head coach was Will Wade, in his third season at LSU. They played their home games at the Pete Maravich Assembly Center in Baton Rouge, Louisiana, as a member of the Southeastern Conference. They finished the season 21–10, 12–6 in SEC play to finish in a tie for second place. They were set to be the No. 3 seed in the SEC tournament with a bye to the quarterfinals. However, the SEC Tournament and all other postseason tournaments were cancelled amid the COVID-19 pandemic.

== Previous season ==
The Tigers finished the 2018–19 season 28–7, 16–2 in SEC play to finish as regular season SEC champions. They lost in the Quarterfinals of the SEC tournament to Florida. The Tigers received an invitation to the NCAA tournament where they defeated Yale in the First Round and Maryland in the Second Round before losing to Michigan State in the Sweet Sixteen. Head coach Will Wade was briefly suspended at the end of the season due to NCAA concerns.

== Offseason ==
=== Departures ===
Name	Number	Pos.	Height	Weight	Year	Hometown	Reason for departure
Naz Reid	0	F	6'10"	240	Freshman	Asbury Park, NJ	Declare for 2019 NBA draft
Tremont Waters	3	G	5'11"	167	Sophomore	New Haven, CT	Declare for 2019 NBA draft
Daryl Edwards	5	G	6'3"	165	Junior	Fresno, CA	Left the team for personal reasons
Noah Thomas	10	G	6'4"	185	Freshman	Cypress, TX	Walk-on; left the team for personal reasons
Kavell Bigby-Williams	11	F	6'11"	230	RS Senior	London, England	Graduated
Will Reese	13	G	6'4"	190	RS Sophomore	Leesville, LA	Walk-on; didn't return
Danya Kingsby	20	G	6'1"	165	Junior	Milwaukee, WI	Transferred to Bradley

=== Incoming transfers ===
Name	Number	Pos.	Height	Weight	Year	Hometown	Previous School
Parker Edwards	3	G	6'3"	195	Sophomore	Mandeville, LA	Southeastern Louisiana
Charles Manning, Jr.	11	G	6'5"	180	Junior	Riverhead, NY	Florida Southwestern State
Caleb Starks	20	G	6'4"	195	Junior	Lafayette, IN	LSU-Eunice

=== 2019 recruiting class ===
College recruiting
Name	Hometown	School	Height	Weight	Commit date
Trendon Watford; PF	Mountain Brook, AL	Mountain Brook High School	6 ft 8 in (2.03 m)	210 lb (95 kg)	May 20, 2019
Trendon Watford; PF	Recruit ratings: Scout: Rivals: 247Sports: ESPN:				
James Bishop; SG	Baltimore, MD	Mount St. Joseph High School	6 ft 2 in (1.88 m)	170 lb (77 kg)	Sep 18, 2018
James Bishop; SG	Recruit ratings: Scout: Rivals: 247Sports: ESPN:				
Overall recruit ranking:
Note: In many cases, Scout, Rivals, 247Sports, On3, and ESPN may conflict in their listings of height and weight.; In these cases, the average was taken. ESPN grades are on a 100-point scale.; Sources: "LSU 2019 Basketball Commitments". Rivals.; "2019 LSU Basketball Commits". Scout.; "ESPN". ESPN.; "Scout.com Team Recruiting Rankings". Scout.; "2019 Team Ranking". Rivals.

=== 2020 recruiting class ===
College recruiting (2020)
Name	Hometown	School	Height	Weight	Commit date
Jalen Cook; PG	Walker, LA	Walker High School	6 ft 0 in (1.83 m)	185 lb (84 kg)	Jun 18, 2019
Jalen Cook; PG	Recruit ratings: Scout: Rivals: 247Sports: ESPN:				
Overall recruit ranking:
Note: In many cases, Scout, Rivals, 247Sports, On3, and ESPN may conflict in their listings of height and weight.; In these cases, the average was taken. ESPN grades are on a 100-point scale.; Sources: "LSU 2020 Basketball Commitments". Rivals.; "2020 LSU Basketball Commits". Scout.; "ESPN". ESPN.; "Scout.com Team Recruiting Rankings". Scout.; "2020 Team Ranking". Rivals.

== Preseason ==
=== SEC media poll ===
The SEC media poll was released on October 15, 2019.

Media poll
Predicted finish	Team
1	Kentucky
2	Florida
3	LSU
4	Auburn
5	Tennessee
6	Alabama
7	Mississippi State
8	Ole Miss
9	Georgia
10	South Carolina
11	Arkansas
12	Texas A&M
13	Missouri
14	Vanderbilt

=== Preseason All-SEC teams ===
The Tigers had one player selected to the preseason all-SEC teams.

Second Team

Skylar Mays

== Roster ==
2019–20 LSU Tigers men's basketball team
Players
Coaches

Pos.	#	Name	Height	Weight	Year	Previous school	Hometown
F	0	Darius Days	6 ft 6 in (1.98 m)	240 lb (109 kg)	So	IMG Academy	Raleigh, FL
G	1	Javonte Smart	6 ft 4 in (1.93 m)	205 lb (93 kg)	So	Scotlandville Magnet HS	Baton Rouge, LA
F	2	Trendon Watford	6 ft 9 in (2.06 m)	235 lb (107 kg)	Fr	Mountain Brook HS	Birmingham, AL
G	3	Parker Edwards (W) (redshirt)	6 ft 3 in (1.91 m)	190 lb (86 kg)	So	Southeastern Louisiana	Mandeville, LA
G	4	Skylar Mays	6 ft 4 in (1.93 m)	205 lb (93 kg)	Sr	Findlay Prep	Baton Rouge, LA
F	5	Emmitt Williams	6 ft 6 in (1.98 m)	230 lb (104 kg)	So	Oak Ridge HS	Fort Myers, FL
G	10	James Bishop	6 ft 2 in (1.88 m)	190 lb (86 kg)	Fr	Mount Saint Joseph HS	Baltimore, MD
G	11	Charles Manning Jr.	6 ft 5 in (1.96 m)	200 lb (91 kg)	Jr	Florida SouthWestern State College	Riverhead, NY
G	12	Marshall Graves	6 ft 4 in (1.93 m)	195 lb (88 kg)	Sr	LSU Laboratory School	Ponchatoula, LA
G	14	Marlon Taylor	6 ft 6 in (1.98 m)	210 lb (95 kg)	Sr	Panola College	Mount Vernon, NY
F	15	Aundre Hyatt	6 ft 5 in (1.96 m)	225 lb (102 kg)	RS Fr	Miller School	The Bronx, NY
G	20	Caleb Starks (W)	6 ft 3 in (1.91 m)	205 lb (93 kg)	Jr	LSU-Eunice	Lafayette, LA
F	21	Courtese Cooper	6 ft 9 in (2.06 m)	220 lb (100 kg)	RS So	Triton College	Elgin, IL

Head coach

- Will Wade (Clemson)

Assistant coach(es)

- Greg Heiar (Franciscan)
- Bill Armstrong (UAB)
- Tasmin Mitchell (LSU)

Legend

- (C) Team captain
- (S) Suspended
- (I) Ineligible
- (W) Walk-on
- Injured
- Current redshirt

Roster
Last update: October 12, 2019

== Schedule and results ==
Date time, TV	Rank^{#}	Opponent^{#}	Result	Record	High points	High rebounds	High assists	Site (attendance) city, state
Exhibition
November 2, 2019*; 4:00 pm	No. 22	at Louisiana Tech; Hoops 4 Disaster Relief	W 83–70		18 – Smart	10 – Watford	4 – Tied	Thomas Assembly Center (6,832); Ruston, LA
Regular season
November 8, 2019*; 7:00 pm, SECN+	No. 22	Bowling Green	W 88–79	1–0	21 – Tied	8 – Smart	5 – Smart	Pete Maravich Assembly Center (9,622); Baton Rouge, LA
November 13, 2019*; 5:00 pm, ESPN2	No. 23	at VCU	L 82–84	1–1	23 – Mays	8 – Mays	3 – Tied	Siegel Center (7,637); Richmond, VA
November 16, 2019*; 3:00 pm, SECN+	No. 23	Nicholls	W 75–65	2–1	18 – Mays	12 – Williams	5 – Smart	Pete Maravich Assembly Center (8,833); Baton Rouge, LA
November 19, 2019*; 6:00 pm, SECN		UMBC	W 77–50	3–1	16 – Manning Jr.	12 – Watford	4 – Bishop	Pete Maravich Assembly Center (8,783); Baton Rouge, LA
November 22, 2019*; 6:00 pm, CBSSN		vs. No. 15 Utah State; Jersey Mike's Jamaica Classic	L 78–80	3–2	30 – Mays	8 – Williams	4 – Smart	Montego Bay Convention Centre (1,452); Montego Bay, Jamaica
November 24, 2019*; 1:30 pm, CBSSN		vs. Rhode Island; Jersey Mike's Jamaica Classic	W 96–83	4–2	27 – Williams	9 – Tied	6 – Tied	Montego Bay Convention Centre; Montego Bay, Jamaica
November 29, 2019*; 7:00 pm, SECN+		Missouri State	W 73–58	5–2	20 – Days	10 – Days	9 – Smart	Pete Maravich Assembly Center (9,892); Baton Rouge, LA
December 3, 2019*; 7:00 pm, SECN		New Orleans	W 90–54	6–2	18 – Tied	10 – Tied	8 – Smart	Pete Maravich Assembly Center (8,608); Baton Rouge, LA
December 8, 2019*; 4:00 pm, SECN		Northwestern State	W 109–59	7–2	17 – Smart	10 – Williams	3 – Tied	Pete Maravich Assembly Center (9,483); Baton Rouge, LA
December 18, 2019*; 7:00 pm, SECN		East Tennessee State	L 63–74	7–3	16 – Williams	11 – Williams	7 – Smart	Pete Maravich Assembly Center (8,556); Baton Rouge, LA
December 21, 2019*; 8:00 pm, FS1		vs. USC; Basketball Hall of Fame Classic	L 68–70	7–4	21 – Mays	11 – Days	4 – Tied	Staples Center (8,296); Los Angeles, CA
December 29, 2019*; 2:00 pm, SECN		Liberty	W 74–57	8–4	14 – Days	8 – Watford	6 – Smart	Pete Maravich Assembly Center (9,193); Baton Rouge, LA
January 4, 2020; 11:00 am, ESPNU		at Tennessee	W 78–64	9–4 (1–0)	21 – Smart	11 – Days	4 – Smart	Thompson–Boling Arena (18,653); Knoxville, TN
January 8, 2020; 8:00 pm, ESPNU		Arkansas	W 79–77	10–4 (2–0)	21 – Watford	16 – Days	3 – Tied	Pete Maravich Assembly Center (8,662); Baton Rouge, LA
January 11, 2020; 7:00 pm, ESPN		Mississippi State	W 60–59	11–4 (3–0)	17 – Williams	8 – Days	6 – Smart	Pete Maravich Assembly Center (10,364); Baton Rouge, LA
January 14, 2020; 7:00 pm, SECN		at Texas A&M	W 89–85 ^{OT}	12–4 (4–0)	19 – Tied	11 – Watford	8 – Mays	Reed Arena (7,068); College Station, TX
January 18, 2020; 7:00 pm, ESPN2		at Ole Miss	W 80–76	13–4 (5–0)	20 – Smart	10 – Watford	4 – Mays	The Pavilion at Ole Miss (8,043); Oxford, MS
January 21, 2020; 6:00 pm, SECN		Florida	W 84–82	14–4 (6–0)	19 – Williams	11 – Taylor	7 – Tied	Pete Maravich Assembly Center (10,479); Baton Rouge, LA
January 25, 2020*; 1:00 pm, ESPN		at Texas; Big 12/SEC Challenge	W 69–67	15–4	22 – Watford	7 – Tied	5 – Mays	Frank Erwin Center (11,287); Austin, TX
January 29, 2020; 6:00 pm, ESPN2	No. 22	Alabama	W 90–76	16–4 (7–0)	23 – Williams	15 – Watford	4 – Smart	Pete Maravich Assembly Center (10,871); Baton Rouge, LA
February 1, 2020; 11:00 am, ESPN2	No. 22	Ole Miss	W 73–63	17–4 (8–0)	21 – Smart	11 – Taylor	3 – Smart	Pete Maravich Assembly Center (11,112); Baton Rouge, LA
February 5, 2020; 8:00 pm, SECN	No. 18	at Vanderbilt	L 90–99	17–5 (8–1)	26 – Watford	11 – Williams	3 – Tied	Memorial Gymnasium (9,256); Nashville, TN
February 8, 2020; 11:00 am, ESPN	No. 18	at No. 11 Auburn	L 90–91 ^{OT}	17–6 (8–2)	30 – Mays	7 – Tied	8 – Mays	Auburn Arena (9,121); Auburn, AL
February 11, 2020; 8:00 pm, SECN	No. 25	Missouri	W 82–78	18–6 (9–2)	23 – Mays	10 – Days	2 – Tied	Pete Maravich Assembly Center (10,990); Baton Rouge, LA
February 15, 2020; 3:00 pm, ESPN2	No. 25	at Alabama	L 82–88	18–7 (9–3)	24 – Mays	10 – Williams	4 – Smart	Coleman Coliseum (12,479); Tuscaloosa, AL
February 18, 2020; 8:00 pm, ESPN		No. 10 Kentucky	L 76–79	18–8 (9–4)	17 – Mays	11 – Days	7 – Smart	Pete Maravich Assembly Center (13,260); Baton Rouge, LA
February 22, 2020; 5:00 pm, ESPN2		at South Carolina	W 86–80	19–8 (10–4)	18 – Tied	10 – Watford	6 – Mays	Colonial Life Arena (15,979); Columbia, SC
February 26, 2020; 8:00 pm, ESPN2		at Florida	L 66–81	19–9 (10–5)	25 – Williams	11 – Watford	2 – Tied	O'Connell Center (10,002); Gainesville, FL
February 29, 2020; 11:00 am, ESPN2		Texas A&M	W 64–50	20–9 (11–5)	24 – Mays	8 – Mays	3 – Tied	Pete Maravich Assembly Center (13,215); Baton Rouge, LA
March 4, 2020; 6:00 pm, SECN		at Arkansas	L 90–99	20–10 (11–6)	28 – Mays	7 – Smart	6 – Mays	Bud Walton Arena (15,169); Fayetteville, AR
March 7, 2020; 1:00 pm, ESPN2		Georgia	W 94–64	21–10 (12–6)	30 – Taylor	11 – Watford	10 – Smart	Pete Maravich Assembly Center (11,697); Baton Rouge, LA
SEC Tournament
March 13, 2020; 8:30 pm, SECN	(3)	vs. Quarterfinals	Cancelled due to the COVID-19 pandemic					Bridgestone Arena; Nashville, TN
*Non-conference game. ^{#}Rankings from AP Poll. (#) Tournament seedings in parentheses. All times are in Central Time.

Schedule Source

== Rankings ==
Ranking movements Legend: ██ Increase in ranking ██ Decrease in ranking — = Not ranked RV = Received votes
	Week																				
Poll	Pre	1	2	3	4	5	6	7	8	9	10	11	12	13	14	15	16	17	18	19	Final
AP	22	23	RV	RV	—	—	RV	—	—	—	RV	RV	22	18	25	RV	RV	RV	RV		Not released
Coaches	24	24^	RV	RV	—	RV	RV	—	—	RV	RV	RV	24	18	RV	RV	RV	RV	RV	RV	

*AP does not release post-NCAA Tournament rankings
^Coaches did not release a Week 2 poll
