= On the bubble =

Sports terminology

The phrase "on the bubble" is sports terminology for being on the cusp of something; this could range from a team that is just on the cusp of being in the postseason or postseason conversation (also known as bubble teams), or a player who is considered almost good enough to make a roster (bubble player).

== NCAA Division I men's and women's basketball tournaments ==
"On the bubble" is most popular when talking about the NCAA Division I men's and women's basketball tournaments. As Selection Sunday approaches at the end of each season, roughly five to six teams have credentials that are on the fringes of tournament qualification. When a team is on the bubble, and does get into the tournament, it is most commonly placed as an 11th seed and will often play another team that was on the bubble in one of the play-in games known in the NCAA tournaments as the First Four. If such a team does not make the NCAA tournament, it will frequently be a top seed in a secondary national tournament—either the men's National Invitation Tournament or the Women's Basketball Invitation Tournament.

== How to be on the bubble ==
To be considered on the bubble, there are several different things that have to play out during the season. Firstly, a team must have a respectable record. Each year, when deciding between the five or six bubble teams, the Selection Committee primarily considers strength of schedule, top 50 wins, and top 100 wins. What hurts "bubble teams" trying to get into the tournament is a bad loss to a team that is below 150. Each year there is at least one or two bubble teams that do not make it into the NCAA tournament, as expected by college basketball analysts. During the tournament it is very rare to see bubble teams make a deep run in the tournament, but there have been a few Cinderella teams.

=== Recent notable bubble teams ===
Almost every season there are two or three really big Upsets, with at least one of them coming from a team that was considered to be on the Bubble. Listed below are many of the teams that were listed on the bubble, but made a run in the NCAA Tournament.

- Syracuse (2016 NCAA Tournament) Made the 2016 Final Four (college basketball)
- Virginia Commonwealth University (2011 NCAA Tournament) Made the 2011 Final Four
- George Mason University Made the 2006 Final Four

Many bubble teams have done some damage in the tournament, but have not quite been able to win the National Championship yet.

=== On the roster bubble ===
The roster bubble deals with rosters from numerous leagues, such as Major League Baseball (MLB), National Football League (NFL), National Basketball Association (NBA), and National Hockey League (NHL). Each of these leagues have a certain number of players that are allowed on the roster, which means there are always a few players that do not make the cut. From the four leagues listed above, the one that is talked about the most for being difficult to make the roster is Major League Baseball.

==== MLB roster bubble ====
Major League Baseball (MLB) has by far the largest number of people considered to be on the roster bubble. Each team can sign a maximum of 40 players to major-league contracts, of which only 26 can be on the active roster for any specific game (except for regular-season games on or after September 1, when the active roster expands to exactly 28). Players on both the 40-man reserve list and 26-man active roster are distributed among 10 different positions (pitcher, eight other positions, and designated hitter). Players on the 40-man reserve list are effectively "on the bubble" for active MLB rosters. The majority of players on the bubble are in the minor leagues. Coaches use spring training to figure out which 26 players will make the roster. Players that are on the bubble may start the season in Minor League Baseball in hopes of making the team's active MLB roster in the future.

==== NFL roster bubble ====
The NFL has a few players that are considered to be on the bubble, but not as many as other professional sports. The reason for this is because each NFL roster consists of fifty-three players, which makes the coaches' decision often fairly easy. If bubble players do not make the roster, they will oftentimes be signed to the team's practice squad or may be picked up by a different NFL team if they are talented enough.

==== NBA roster bubble ====
The NBA has by far the fewest people that are considered to be on the bubble; this is because each team only has thirteen players on the roster. Most players that are on the roster bubble will make the NBA team because so few players are actually in the league. The last few men that make the team typically do not get any playing time unless the game is out of hand. If a bubble player does not make the team, he may be sent down to the G League in hopes of one day being called up to the professional level. The players most obviously "on the bubble" are those signed by NBA teams to two-way contracts, allowing them to be freely moved between the NBA and G League rosters without risking losing them to another NBA team. (Note: Most G League players are signed to the league instead of an individual team, allowing them to be called up by any NBA team.)

==== NHL roster bubble ====
The NHL has anywhere from zero to three or four players that are considered to be on the roster bubble in the fall training camp every year. One NHL roster consists of twenty players that are eighteen skaters and two goaltenders. If bubble players do not make the team, they may start out in the American Hockey League, which is similar to the minor leagues in baseball. Hockey has a little bit bigger of a roster compared to other professional sports, which makes it hard to have so many players on the bubble.
