= Clay Moser =

American basketball coach

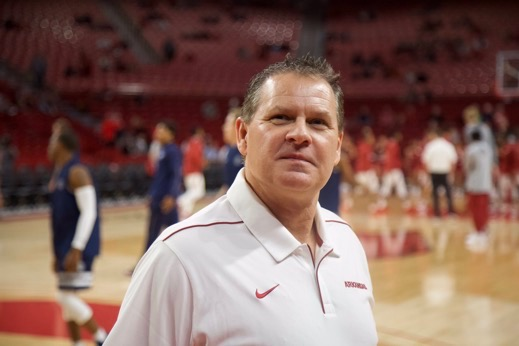
- Moser on the Arkansas Razorbacks Court pre-game

Personal information
- Born: November 10, 1962 (age 64) Dorchester, Nebraska

Career information
- College: Fergus Falls CC; Wisconsin–La Crosse

Career history
- 1984–1987: Minnesota State Community and Technical College (assistant)
- 1987–1989: NC State (GA)
- 1989–1993: Sioux Falls SkyForce (assistant)
- 2001–2002: Treasure Valley CC
- 2003–2004: Great Lakes Storm
- 2004–2005: Jilin Northeast Tigers
- 2008–2009: Rio Grande Valley Vipers
- 2010–2011: Reno Bighorns (associate HC)
- 2011–2019: Los Angeles Lakers (scout/assistant)
- 2019–2022: Arkansas (assistant)
- 2022–2023: Iowa Wolves (assistant)

Clay Moser (born November 10, 1962) is an American basketball coach who was most recently an assistant coach for the Iowa Wolves of the NBA G-League after a stint as an assistant coach for the Arkansas Razorbacks of the Southeastern Conference (SEC). Previously, he held positions with many professional teams, including the Los Angeles Lakers, the Sacramento Kings, the Golden State Warriors, the Orlando Magic, the Cleveland Cavaliers, and the New Orleans Hornets in Oklahoma City, Oklahoma, Post-Katrina.

== Chronological career history ==
Moser's career started in 1984 with his coaching experience at his junior college in Minnesota, and has continued over multiple parallels and leagues, including basketball operations, coaching, scouting, management and ownership, both domestic and international, and most notably within the NBA, CBA, D-League, and NCAA.

=== Beginning ===
Moser started his passionate basketball career in college, coaching at Fergus Falls Community College, now Minnesota State Community and Technical College. He was the Head Assistant Coach between 1984 and 1987 under legendary coach Dave Retzlaff, where he helped lead the team to three Northwest Division Championships in three years with one player eventually playing professionally. He helped the team to two notable milestones, the school's first championship in 1984 in the Minnesota College Athletic Conference, and the school's first National Tourney Appearance at the 1984 NJCAA Region XIII Championships. He graduated from the UW-LaCrosse with a BS in Physical Education with a Sport Management Emphasis which led him to working under Jim Valvano at NC State.

Upon graduating, Moser headed East where he worked for Valvano at North Carolina State University as an assistant coach from August 1987 to August 1989. During this time, he worked as a Recruiting Coordinator, during four signing periods, where he signed twelve players, including Derrick Chandler, Bryant Feggins, Tom Gugliotta, Mickey Hinnant, Pancho Hodges, Jamie Knox, David Lee, Gary Madison, Donnie Seale, Kevin Thompson, Byron Tucker, and Craig Tyson. Through Moser's time with this team, they achieved two consecutive NCAA tournament appearances, a 1989 Sweet 16 Appearance, and were champions in the 1989 Atlantic Coast Conference. Seven of the twelve players he recruited played in the NBA, and two others played in other pro leagues, respectively. Moser assisted in all aspects of basketball operations, including game/practice preparation, academic monitoring, player development, recruiting, on floor practice. This led to him operating The Jim Valvano Basketball School, which was an extremely profitable venture.

=== The rise and fall of the CBA ===
In August 1989, Moser accepted a position with the Sioux Falls Sky Force in South Dakota within the former Continental Basketball Association (CBA) as an assistant coach and assistant director of basketball operations. Between 1990 and 1991, the Sky Force jumped to the 4th most improved team in the CBA with 23% more wins, and led the CBA in scoring with 117.3 ppg. Moser was promoted within the franchise to general manager in 1992, and vice president in 1993. During this time, he participated in the Great Midstates Recruiting Review as the Creator, Owner, and Founder from 1993 to 1996 in Sioux Falls, South Dakota.

He spent his summers of 1990 and 1991 as the head coach for the Southern California Summer Pro League in Los Angeles, California, which held an overall record of 13–7 with 1–3 Playoffs where each team made playoffs. Here, he coached many free agents in the NBA division, including Danny Manning, Robert Pack, David Wingate, Chris Corchiani, Byron Scott, and Pat Cummings. They advanced to the Free Agent Finals in 1990. He was named to Coach Free Agent All-Stars for the years 1990 and 2004.

In July 1994, Moser moved his young family to St. Louis, Missouri where he accepted the position with the CBA as vice president of basketball operations. He received a promotion in October 1996 to senior vice president, and eventually left for the position of CEO, President, general manager and eventual part owner of the Idaho Stampede in Boise, Idaho, in April 1997. While in this position, he advanced within the CBA to Western Regional Vice President of the league in May 2000. December 2000, he joined, for the second time in his career, the USA Basketball board of directors in Colorado Springs, Colorado, for two years.

Moser ended his relationship with the Stampede during the CBA shutdown in February 2001, a result of league bankruptcy due to the controversial management of Isiah Thomas, where Thomas forfeited the CBA as the primary player development league. In response, the NBA created their own developmental league, which played its first game the following season in November 2001.

He accepted a position with Treasure Valley Community College in Ontario, Oregon, as the men's basketball head coach and PE Instructor from 2001 to 2002. With his help, he increased wins by 30% from the previous season, 14–16 record overall. For the first and only time in the school's history (1–40), TVCC beat Utah Valley State, set the school record for largest margin of victory (70) on 12/2/01 (117–47), and defeated Rick's College at Rick's for the first and only time in school history. Additionally, he moved the team into a positive scoring margin for the season, an improvement from a negative margin (increase of over 7 PPG), and increased scoring by 12.5% (80.5 from 70.4), topping the century mark 6 times. Moser recruited and signed 11 players from April to August to fill the roster, with only three scholarships to give. TVCC played in the NJCAA DI division, and in Region XVIII, eventually producing a national champion and three NBA players.

=== Transition to NBA ===
Moser worked as an advanced scout for the Golden State Warriors in Oakland, California, under Eric Musselman for the 2002–2003 season where the team was most improved in the NBA, and Coach Musselman was runner-up coach-of-the-year. Moser's work included X's and O's, statistical analysis, and personal analysis of upcoming opponents for coaching staff. This was the beginning of the professional friendship between Moser and Musselman for future years to come.

Between 2003 and 2004, Moser heads back to the CBA to accept a position as head coach and president for the Great Lakes Storm in Birch Run, Michigan. During this time, he recorded at least one win over each team in the league. He signed free agents Anthony Bonner and Stais Boseman, future all-stars, and Jimmy King and Shelton Jones, two CBA MVP's. During this difficult time in CBA history, with over half of the teams in bankruptcy, Moser increased this franchise revenue by nearly 500%.

=== Chinese Basketball Association ===
In the wake of the CBA's bankruptcy, Moser saw opportunity overseas. Specifically, in Changchun City as the Coach and Team Consultant for the Jilin Northeastern Tigers from 2004 to 2005. Working in the People's Republic of China presented many occupational difficulties with culture shock and translation technicalities, yet Moser raised this team up in Jilin Province, clinching the North Division Playoff Berth with 19 days remaining in the regular season, and holding a 15–9 North Division record, including winning 12 division games at home. The Club set specific goals for the 2004–05 season of which Moser achieved the following victories: recorded the first ever road win over Shanxi 16/2/05, 116–111, brought the team to the playoffs, played younger players more minutes during this season than previous seasons to gain experience, and improved the team defensively, where the PPG improved from 107 to 99. As the only foreign coach in the league to last the entire season, he held a regular season record 19–19 playing 9 games without the best import or overall player in the mid-season stretch. His other notable improvements and achievements with the team included coaching the 22 year old Wang Bo to first All-Star selection after sixth year in League, and bringing his coaching staff to the All-Star bench versus the Korean Basketball League (KBL). The Jilin Northeastern Tigers held a 2–6 playoff record for this season.

=== Return to the United States ===
Moser had a busy summer upon his return to the US. He was the Westchester Wildfire head coach in the USBL for the 2005 Summer Playoffs. He directed the first ever American coach run basketball camp for USBL in Beirut, Lebanon in conjunction with Med Quest, a partner of Super Agency, Interperformances. He participated in the NBA Summer League as assistant coach for the San Antonio Spurs where he assisted summer head coach in all facets of successful pre-league mini camp and Rocky Mountain Revue. He continued the year as an NBA Consultant for Team Business Operations and International Business Development in New York City, NY. He worked with Owner, President, CMO and CFO of New Orleans/Oklahoma City Hornets post Hurricane Katrina to transition the team from New Orleans to Oklahoma City, as well as developed a comprehensive review of all aspects of the Chinese Basketball Association for the NBA by analyzing rules, venues, lodging, accommodations, travel, revenue, expenses, and league viability. This relationship lead to the position of Vice President of Business Development for the newly relocated Oklahoma City Hornets for the 2005–2006 season.

With the Hornets, Moser ran the ticket sales and operations department where he managed 37 full-time employees and nearly 32 million dollars in sales. He assisted with interdepartmental Sales & Marketing collaboration to reach 22 sellouts, 10 standing room only crowds that included setting the largest sports crowd in Ford Center history on two different occasions while ranking 1st in the league for customer satisfaction and likelihood to renew season tickets. During the regular season, he also supervised the ticket sales and operations for four unprecedented separate facilities: Ford Center, Lloyd-Noble Center, New Orleans Arena, and the Pete Maravich Assembly Center.

=== Back to coaching roots ===
For the 2006–2007 season, Moser joined head coach Eric Musselman as the Advanced Scout for the Sacramento Kings. During this time, he became proficient in XOS Play Tools Software while perfecting his X's and O's, statistical, and personnel analysis of upcoming opponents for the coaching staff. With this team, he joined the summer league as a member of the assistant coaching staff, as well as a member of the Basketball Without Borders coaching staff where he returned to the People's Republic of China in Shanghai, July 2007.

While in Shanghai working with BWB, he received the opportunity to extend his stay in China by working for the Vlade Divac Children's Foundation in Shanghai, Haikou, Hainan, PRC, Hong Kong, SAR, as a Celebrity Coach where he conducted fundraising and philanthropic camps and clinics.

He returned that summer to a position with the Orlando Magic as their Advanced Scout for the 2007–2008 season where his primary work involved X's and O's and statistical analysis of opponents while on the road.

The 2008–2009 season took Moser to McAllen, Texas, as head coach for the Rio Grande Valley Vipers where his team held a 21–29 record and improved the team's road record by 80%. He was entrusted in leading the league in promotional and charitable appearances, bringing his team honorable recognitions through their season. During this time, he produced NBA Call-Up Jawad Williams to the Cleveland Cavaliers, and developed him into D-League Player of the Month in March 2009. He led his team to the franchise's first ever wins in Austin, Idaho, and Utah while also setting the franchise's best 11-game stint where they won 8. As a coach that operated his department with fiscal responsibility, he was able to develop Trent Strickland to D-League honorable mention at his career best, Kurt Looby to the league's leading shot blocker, Ernest Scott to D-League All-Star "Dream Factory" Friday Night (another franchise first), as well as produced three players to the Chinese Basketball Association.

Moser's work with the Vipers caught the attention of the Cleveland Cavaliers for the 2009–2010 season where he provided the tools as Regional Advanced Scout to help the team finish with the best record in the NBA. Summer of 2010 was spent in Santo Domingo, Dominican Republic, as the First Assistant for the Dominican Republic national basketball team where the team went undefeated in pool play and finished 5–1 overall. With Moser's help, the team qualified for Pan American Games and FIBA America's Pre-Olympic Qualifier where they secured the silver medal in Centrobasket at the tournament.

Reno, Nevada, received Clay as the associate head coach under Eric Musselman for the 2010–2011 season. He helped set franchise records under the salary line including: a 34–16 record (.680), becoming Western Conference Champions, promoting franchise's first and second ever call-ups Steve Novak, and Danny Green (basketball) to the San Antonio Spurs, made D-League Semifinals and won the franchise's first playoff series. The Bighorns finished first in the league in opponents PPG (98.1) and FG% (.440) while also holding the best home and road record in franchise history, ending with the 2nd best overall record in the D-League, and 2nd in league in turnovers committed per game (15.3). The team didn't lose one game from January 26, 2011 – February 25, 2011, and set records against Illinois with margin of victory (41 vs Springfield), fewest points allowed (72 vs Springfield), and fewest turnovers (5 vs Springfield) all on February 2, 2011. They carried their winning streaks on to at least seven other games, three separate times, holding a franchise record. Unsurprisingly, the team's success increased attendance and increased the 2011–2012 season ticket renewals.

=== The Los Angeles Lakers ===
Moser moved to Los Angeles in August 2011 as associate head coach for the LA D-Fenders in the D-League. The team held first place in its league when he was promoted to the Lakers as Advanced Scout for the 2011–2012 season. During his time with the Lakers, he received three promotions: Head Advanced Scout in August 2012, Assistant Coach/Head Advanced Scout in 2014, and finally to assistant coach and the director of Basketball Strategy, a newly created position specifically for his talents, in 2015. He sat on Laker Analytics Committee specializing in Advance Opponent Statistical Preparation where he was proficient in fast draw, fast scout, and synergy.

=== University of Arkansas Razorbacks ===
On May 27, 2019, Moser signed a one-year contract with the Arkansas Razorbacks as the Men's Basketball Assistant Coach to once again work with Eric Musselman. On March 27, 2021, the Arkansas Razorbacks advanced to the Elite Eight in the March Madness Tournament for the first time in 25 years. On April 6, 2022, Moser stepped down as an assistant coach at the University of Arkansas.

=== Additional notorieties ===
Moser has nearly 30 year old collectors basketball cards.

Clay has sat on numerous boards and committees, participated in multiple camps, speaking engagements, and scouting events, as well as consulted in business as well as TV/Film work.

Moser is also invested in many personal business endeavors within and outside of basketball. He has held his position as vice president of basketball operations for the Southern California Summer Pro League in Long Beach, California, since May 2002.

Moser hosted a coaching clinic in Australia for the Bendigo Braves summer of 2018.

On May 7, 2019, Moser returned to his home state to deliver an inspirational speech about the NBA dream.

== Personal life ==
Moser was born in Dorchester, Nebraska, and moved to Minnesota when he was 7. He has five siblings. Moser has three children and one grandchild.

Home is always where the team is and he currently resides in Fayetteville, Arkansas; however, Moser and his wife both hail from Minnesota where they also maintain a residence.

== Education ==
Moser graduated from the University of Wisconsin – La Crosse in 1987 with a Bachelor of Science in Physical Education with an emphasis in Sports Management. Moser also attended Fergus Falls Community College from 1981 to 1984 where he received an Associate of Arts in General Studies and began his coaching career.

Most recently, he received a Non-Accredited Doctorate in NBA Basketball as an Advanced Scout.
