= Deer Creek (Mississippi) =

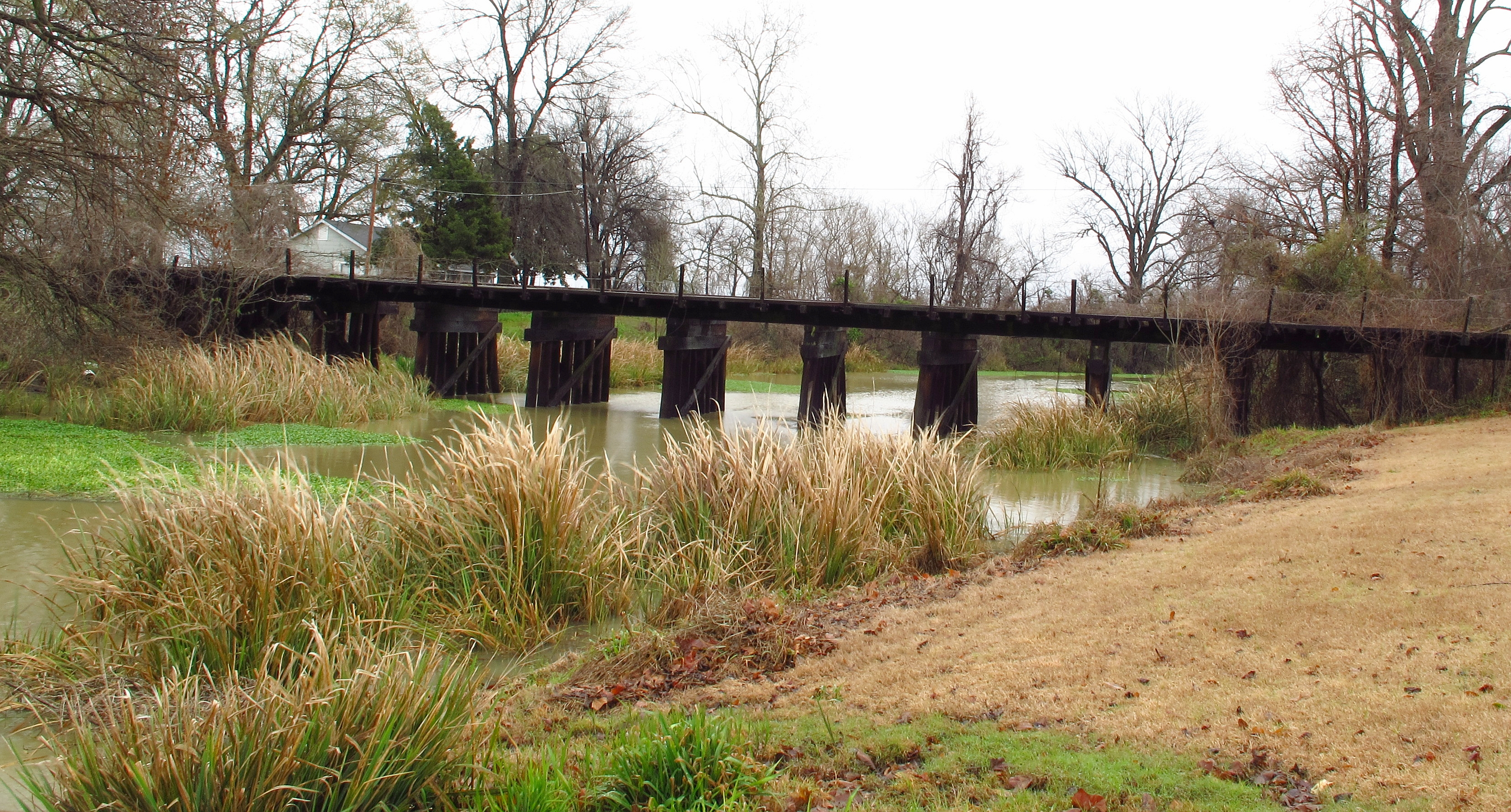
- Bridge of abandoned Illinois Central Railroad line across Deer Creek in Scott

Location
- Country: United States
- State: Mississippi

Physical characteristics
- Source: Lake Boliver
  - location: Scott, Bolivar County, Mississippi
  - coordinates: 33°35′56″N 91°04′50″W
- Mouth: Yazoo River
  - location: Warren County, Mississippi
  - coordinates: 32°32′44″N 90°47′43″W

Deer Creek (also Issaquena Creek or Lower Deer Creek) is a creek in Mississippi, United States. Its source is Lake Bolivar, in Scott, Bolivar County, Mississippi.

== Course ==
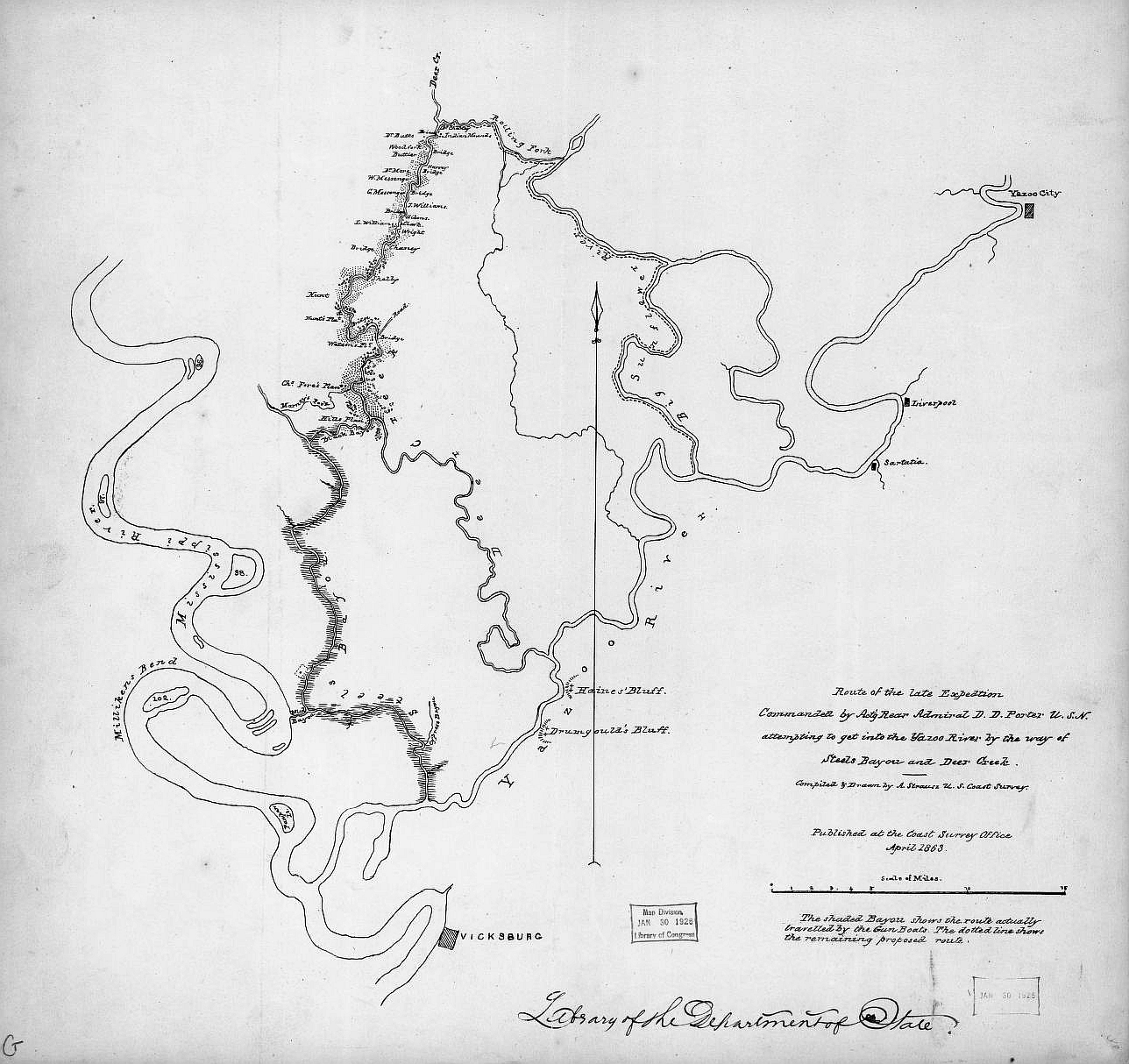
Route of US Navy attempting to access Yazoo River by the way of Steels Bayou and Deer Creek, during American Civil War.

As Deer Creek flows south through the Mississippi Delta, it passes through the following counties: Bolivar, Washington, Sharkey, Issaquena, and Warren; and through the following communities: Metcalfe, Stoneville, Leland, Burdett, Arcola, Hollandale, Panther Burn, Nitta Yuma, Anguilla, Rolling Fork, Cary, Onward, and Valley Park.

Prior to the Civil War the stream was navigable and accessible to the Mississippi River at Lake Bolivar. The Deer Creek watershed is connected to the Big Sunflower River via the Rolling Fork Creek, a connection that occurs only at high water stages and can flow either way.

During the Civil War, a battery of field guns was shipped up the stream to be carried to positions on the Mississippi River at "Greenville Bends" to fire on the U.S. Navy.

== Name ==
Deer Creek's name is an accurate preservation of its native Choctaw name isi okhina, meaning "deer river".

== Muddy Waters nickname ==
Muddy Waters got his nickname "Muddy Waters" by playing in the river.

== See also ==
- List of rivers of Mississippi
