= Jones R. Parker =

American politician (born c. 1845)

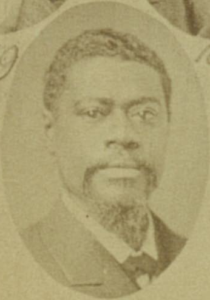

Jones R. Parker (born c. 1845) was a state legislator in Mississippi. He represented Washington County, Mississippi in the Mississippi House of Representatives in 1884 and 1885. He served on the Committee on Public Health and Quarantine.

He served in the state house with fellow Washington County representatives S. M. Spencer and Gilbert Horton.

== See also ==
- African American officeholders from the end of the Civil War until before 1900
- Parry Payton
