= O'Bannon High School =

Location
- 1203 South Raceway Road; Greenville, MS 38701; United States
- Coordinates: 33.3852°N 91.0070°W

Information
- Type: Public
- Established: 1950
- School district: Western Line School District
- Principal: Willie Goins
- Teaching staff: 26.91 (FTE)
- Grades: 7 to 12
- Enrollment: 429 (2023–2024)
- Student to teacher ratio: 15.94
- Colors: Green and white
- Nickname: Greenwave
- Website: westernline.org/obannonhigh

Norma C. O'Bannon High School (known as O'Bannon High School) is a public junior and senior high school located in unincorporated Washington County, Mississippi, USA, adjacent to Greenville. The school is part of the Western Line School District. The school includes students in grades 7 through 12.

== History ==
=== Establishment ===
Norma C. O'Bannon High School (OHS) was established in 1950. The school is named after Norma C. O'Bannon, a career educator in Mississippi who was for many years the Superintendent of Washington County schools.

Norma O'Bannon, was the Illinois-born daughter of a man who bought a plantation in Arcola, Mississippi. She began her career in 1921 at Central School in Greenville, where she taught English literature, civics, and science at the junior high school level. She later moved to elementary education, becoming principal at the city's Starling Elementary School. She became superintendent of Washington County schools in 1948, remaining in that position until 1968. O'Bannon saw a great period of great change during her tenure as superintendent, with Washington County's count of schools being reduced through consolidation from 96 small and segregated facilities to just 6 integrated schools.

=== Demographics ===
O'Bannon High School includes students in grades 7 through 12 — effectively combining a junior and senior high school in a single facility. The school has approximately 435 students, making it the 146th largest of the state's 249 public high schools.

The student body of O'Bannon High School is 95% African-American/Black and 3% White American, with an additional 1% listing an ethnicity including "two or more races." These percentages differ significantly from the state averages of 50% black and 46% white for Mississippi public school students. Some 91% of OHS students are eligible for free or reduced price school lunches, in comparison to 71% of Mississippi students statewide.

The disproportionately high percentage of black students at O'Bannon High School is a legacy of the segregation era, during which wealthy white plantation-owning families traditionally sent their children to out-of-state boarding schools, while poor whites attended fully segregated public schools. With the coming of federally ordered efforts at desegregation in the 1970s, parents of white students, particularly in the Mississippi Delta region, "fled en masse" from public schools to private academies, leaving the public school system in a state of ethnic and economic imbalance. Even in the 21st Century public schools in the Delta region remain predominantly black, with African-American enrollments frequently ranging from 80 to nearly 100 percent — far in excess of the state average.

=== Athletics ===
O'Bannon High School athletic teams are known as the "Greenwaves" and the school colors are Kelly Green, Scarlet, and White
