= Tribbett =

Tribbett is a surname. Notable people with the surname include:

- Derrick Tribbett (born 1984), American musician (stage names Tripp Lee and Sinister)
- Greg Tribbett (born 1968), guitarist & backing vocalist for American band Mudvayne, and supergroup Hellyeah
- Ken Tribbett (born 1992), American soccer (football) player
- Tye Tribbett (born 1976), American gospel music singer, songwriter, keyboardist, choir director

== See also ==
- Tribbett, Mississippi, unincorporated community located in Washington County, Mississippi
- Tribble
- Triblet
- Trivet
