= D.J. Stewart Jr. =

American-Macedonian basketball player (born 1999)

- Stewart with Baskonia in 2026

No. 3 – Baskonia
- Position: Small forward
- League: Liga ACB; EuroLeague

Personal information
- Born: July 28, 1999 (age 27) Grace, Mississippi, U.S.
- Listed height: 1.98 m (6 ft 6 in)
- Listed weight: 205 lb (93 kg)

Career information
- High school: Riverside (Avon, Mississippi)
- College: Mississippi State (2019–2021)
- NBA draft: 2021: undrafted
- Playing career: 2021–present

Career history
- 2021–2022: Sioux Falls Skyforce
- 2022: Austin Spurs
- 2022–2023: Sioux Falls Skyforce
- 2023: Marineros de Puerto Plata
- 2023: Suke Lions
- 2023–2026: Cedevita Olimpija
- 2026–present: Baskonia

Career highlights
- 2× Slovenian League champion (2024, 2025); 2× Slovenian Cup winner (2024, 2025); Second-team All-SEC – Coaches (2021)
- Stats at NBA.com
- Stats at Basketball Reference

DeWayne "D.J." Stewart Jr. (born July 28, 1999) is an American–born naturalized Macedonian professional basketball player for Saski Baskonia of the Liga ACB and the EuroLeague. He played college basketball for the Mississippi State Bulldogs.

== High school career ==
Stewart attended Riverside High School in Avon, Mississippi. As a freshman, Stewart averaged 15.2 points, 6.4 rebounds and 2.8 assists per game. In his sophomore season, he averaged 17.4 points, 6.2 rebounds and 3.1 assists per game. Entering his junior season, he did not receive any NCAA Division I offers. As a junior, Stewart averaged 18.9 points, 9.7 rebounds and 3.1 assists per game. He averaged 25.3 points, 10.7 rebounds and 2.9 assists per game and was named All-State by The Clarion-Ledger in his senior season. He committed to playing college basketball for Mississippi State over offers from Alabama, Illinois and Ole Miss. He was rated a four-star recruit by Rivals.

== College career ==
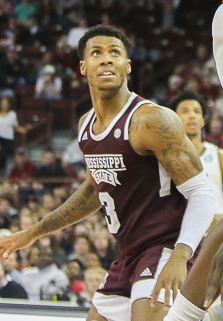
Stewart with Mississippi State in 2020

Stewart redshirted his first season at Mississippi State because head coach Ben Howland did not expect him to receive significant playing time. As a freshman, he averaged 8.5 points and 2.5 rebounds per game. On December 12, 2020, Stewart scored a career-high 32 points in an 85–82 double overtime loss to Dayton. As a sophomore, he averaged 16 points, 3.4 rebounds and 3.1 assists per game. He earned Second Team All-Southeastern Conference (SEC) honors from the league's coaches. Stewart was one of three finalists for the Howell Trophy. On April 1, 2021, he declared for the 2021 NBA draft while maintaining his college eligibility. He later signed with an agent, forgoing his remaining eligibility.

== Professional career ==
=== Sioux Falls Skyforce (2021–2022) ===
After going undrafted in the 2021 NBA draft, Stewart joined the Miami Heat for the 2021 NBA Summer League. On August 17, 2021, he signed with the Heat. Stewart was waived before the start of the season and joined the Sioux Falls Skyforce as an affiliate player.

=== Austin Spurs (2022) ===
On March 4, 2022, Stewart signed a two-way contract with the San Antonio Spurs. However, Stewart did not appear in any one of the games for the San Antonio Spurs but only played for there affiliated team Austin Spurs.

=== Sioux Falls Skyforce (2022–2023) ===
On September 21, 2022, the Dallas Mavericks announced that they had signed Stewart. He was waived before the start of the season on October 13, 2022. and on October 24, 2022, rejoined the Sioux Falls Skyforce roster.

=== Marineros de Puerto Plata (2023) ===
On May 1, 2023, Stewart signed with the Marineros de Puerto Plata of the Liga Nacional de Baloncesto until the end of the season.

=== Cedevita Olimpija (2023–2026) ===
On September 22, 2023, Stewart signed a one-year deal with Cedevita Olimpija. On June 15, 2024, he signed a new contract for two more years.

=== Baskonia (2026–present) ===
On June 28, 2026, Stewart signed a two-season deal with Baskonia of the Liga ACB and the EuroLeague.

== Career statistics ==
Legend
GP	Games played	GS	Games started	MPG	Minutes per game
FG%	Field goal percentage	3P%	3-point field goal percentage	FT%	Free throw percentage
RPG	Rebounds per game	APG	Assists per game	SPG	Steals per game
BPG	Blocks per game	PPG	Points per game	**Bold**	Career high

*	Led NCAA Division I

=== College ===
Year	Team	GP	GS	MPG	FG%	3P%	FT%	RPG	APG	SPG	BPG	PPG
2018–19	Mississippi State	Redshirt										
2019–20	Mississippi State	31	17	29.6	**.456**	.329	.700	2.5	1.6	1.0	**.2**	8.5
2020–21	Mississippi State	**33***	**33***	**35.0**	.410	**.344**	**.806**	**3.4**	**3.1**	**1.4**	**.2**	**16.0**
Career		64	50	32.4	.425	.339	.772	3.0	2.4	1.2	.2	12.4
