= Princeton, Mississippi =

- Ghost town
- Location within Mississippi
- Coordinates: 33°03′03″N 91°07′10″W
- Country: United States
- State: Mississippi
- County: Washington
- Elevation: 112 ft (34 m)
- Time zone: UTC-6 (Central (CST))
  - Summer (DST): UTC-5 (CDT)
- GNIS feature ID: 687290

Princeton is a ghost town located in Washington County, Mississippi, United States.

Once a busy port on the Mississippi River, Princeton today is covered by forest and a portion of the Mississippi Levee. Nothing remains of the settlement.

== History ==
Princeton was named for William Berry Prince, who settled on nearby Lake Jackson with his wife Sarah S. Jefferies in the early 1820s. Princeton was one of the first towns in the Mississippi Delta.

In 1830, Princeton became Washington County's second county seat after the first county seat, New Mexico, caved into the Mississippi River.

The Mississippi River flowed directly west of Princeton, and Princeton Landing was the town's port. Across the river in Arkansas was the now-extinct town of Grand Lake.

The Mississippi Legislature incorporated the Lake Washington and Deer Creek Railroad and Banking Company in 1836. Based in Princeton, the railroad began constructing a line east from the town to Lake Washington and Deer Creek. The intent was to move cotton by railroad to Princeton, where it could be shipped by boat along the Mississippi River. Only a portion of the railroad bed was completed before the company's charter was repealed in 1839.

In 1838, the steamer Oronoko was anchored in the port at Princeton when a boiler blew, killing between 100 and 150 on board. Most of the passengers were recent immigrants traveling north from New Orleans. After a second explosion on the Ohio River that same week killed 150, the U.S. government passed its first legislation requiring steamboat owners to take measures to protect those on board.

An early settler to Washington County was Junius Richard Ward, who amassed a fortune in hemp, cotton, and mercantile and shipping interests. Ward built a mansion near Lake Washington, and also owned Ward Hall in Kentucky. Ward erected a 40-room mansion—against the advice of friends—overlooking the Mississippi River north of Princeton.

At its peak, Princeton had 600 residents, 12 stores, an inn, a bank, a private school, and a livery stable.

The county seat was moved to Greenville in 1844.

By 1850, most of the town had caved into the river. The last remaining merchant, S.B. Lawson, sold the townsite and remaining buildings to a former slave for $125. In 1858, Ward's mansion washed away in a flood.

The Mississippi River has since changed its course several miles west, and the former townsite is now located next to Carolina Chute, an oxbow lake.

== Notable people ==
- William H. Hammett, U.S. Representative from Mississippi.
