= Lamont, Mississippi =

- Unincorporated community
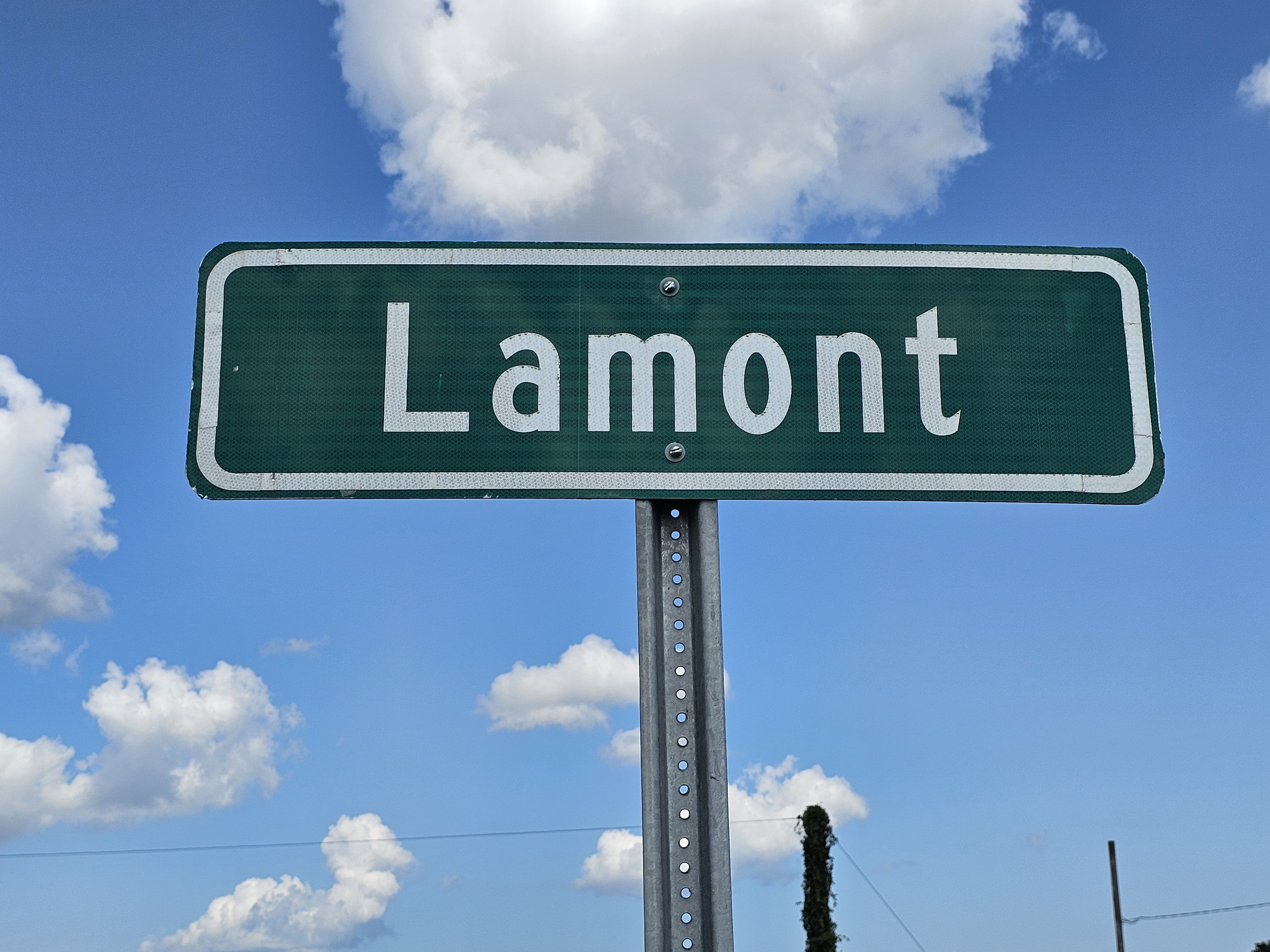
- Highway sign outside of Lamont

- Location within Mississippi Location within the United States
- Coordinates: 33°32′07″N 91°04′34″W
- Country: United States
- State: Mississippi
- County: Bolivar
- Elevation: 122 ft (37 m)
- Time zone: UTC-6 (Central (CST))
  - Summer (DST): UTC-5 (CDT)
- ZIP code: 38703
- Area code: 662
- GNIS feature ID: 672288

Lamont is an unincorporated community located in southern Bolivar County, Mississippi, United States on Mississippi Highway 1 on the Bolivar County/Washington County border. Lamont is approximately 4 miles (6.4 km) north of Winterville and approximately 5 miles (8.0 km) south of Scott. Lamont is located at the junction of two branches of the former Yazoo and Mississippi Valley Railroad.

A post office first began operation under the name Lamont in 1888.

Irene Scruggs, a Piedmont blues and country blues singer, was born in Lamont.
