= McCutcheon, Mississippi =

- Unincorporated community
- Location within Mississippi Location within the United States
- Coordinates: 33°14′04″N 90°52′47″W
- Country: United States
- State: Mississippi
- County: Washington
- Elevation: 118 ft (36 m)
- Time zone: UTC-6 (Central (CST))
  - Summer (DST): UTC-5 (CDT)
- ZIP code: 38748
- Area code: 662
- GNIS feature ID: 687251

McCutcheon is an unincorporated community located in Washington County, Mississippi. McCutcheon is approximately 2.6 miles (4.2 km) south of Arcola and 5.3 miles (8.5 km) north of Hollandale along Old Highway 61.
