= Elizabeth, Mississippi =

- Census-designated place
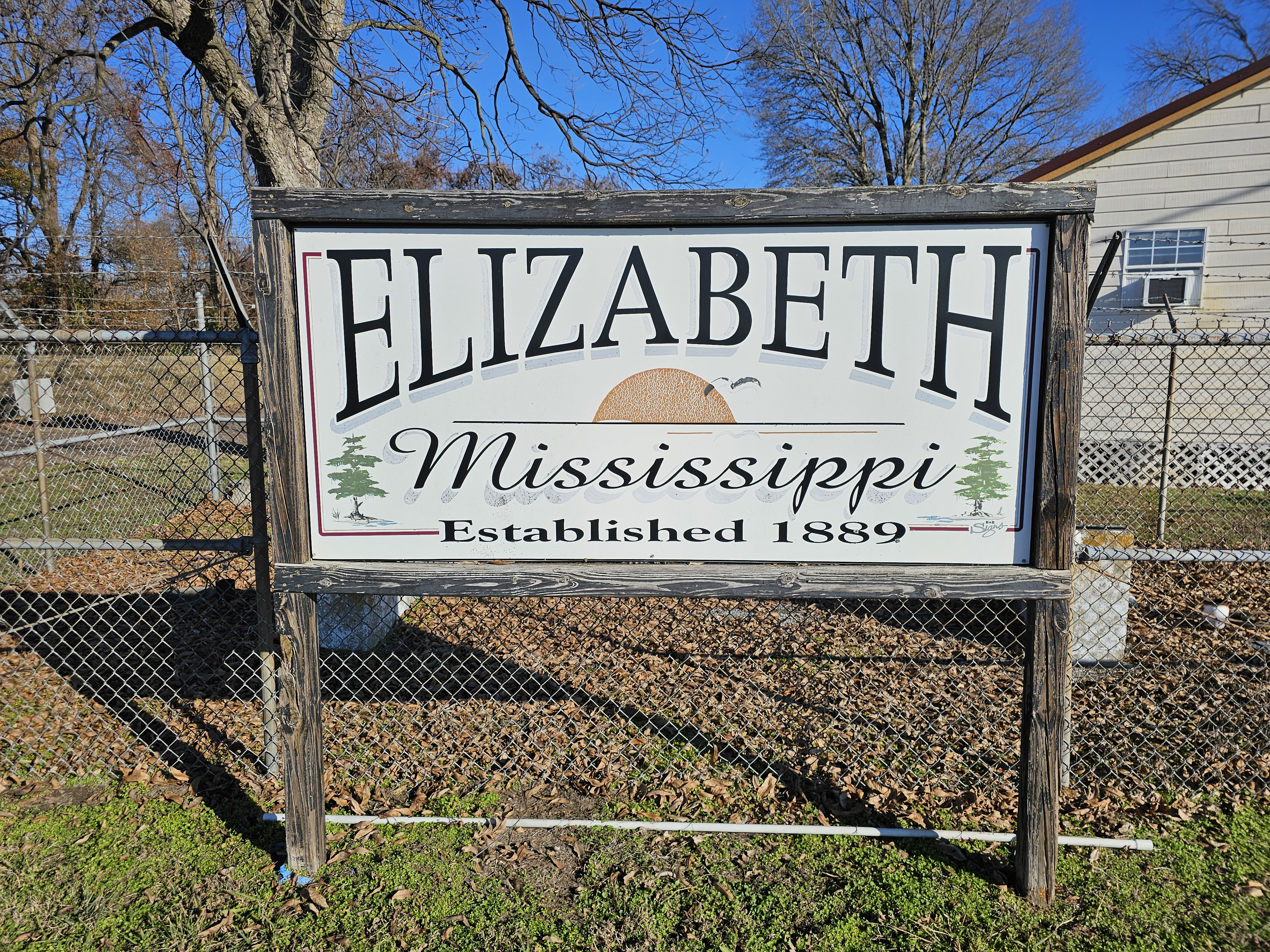
- Welcome Sign in Elizabeth

- Location within Mississippi Location within the United States
- Coordinates: 33°25′25″N 90°52′42″W
- Country: United States
- State: Mississippi
- County: Washington

Area
  - Total: 0.32 sq mi (0.82 km^{2})
  - Land: 0.32 sq mi (0.82 km^{2})
  - Water: 0 sq mi (0.00 km^{2})
- Elevation: 121 ft (37 m)

Population (2020)
  - Total: 127
  - Density: 400.9/sq mi (154.79/km^{2})
- Time zone: UTC-6 (Central (CST))
  - Summer (DST): UTC-5 (CDT)
- ZIP code: 38756
- Area code: 662
- GNIS feature ID: 2812751

Elizabeth is a census-designated place (CDP) and unincorporated community located in Washington County, Mississippi. Elizabeth is approximately 1 mile (1.6 km) north of Leland and 2 miles (3.2 km) east of Stoneville.

Per the 2020 Census, the population was 127.

== Demographics ==
Historical population
Census	Pop.	Note	%±
2020	127		—
U.S. Decennial Census; 2020

Elizabeth was first listed as a census designated place in the 2020 U.S. census.

=== 2020 census ===
Elizabeth CDP, Mississippi – Racial and ethnic composition Note: the US Census treats Hispanic/Latino as an ethnic category. This table excludes Latinos from the racial categories and assigns them to a separate category. Hispanics/Latinos may be of any race.
Race / Ethnicity (NH = Non-Hispanic)	Pop 2020	% 2020
White alone (NH)	23	18.11%
Black or African American alone (NH)	96	75.59%
Native American or Alaska Native alone (NH)	0	0.00%
Asian alone (NH)	0	0.00%
Native Hawaiian or Pacific Islander alone (NH)	0	0.00%
Other race alone (NH)	0	0.00%
Mixed race or Multiracial (NH)	4	3.15%
Hispanic or Latino (any race)	4	3.15%
Total	127	100.00%

== Gallery ==
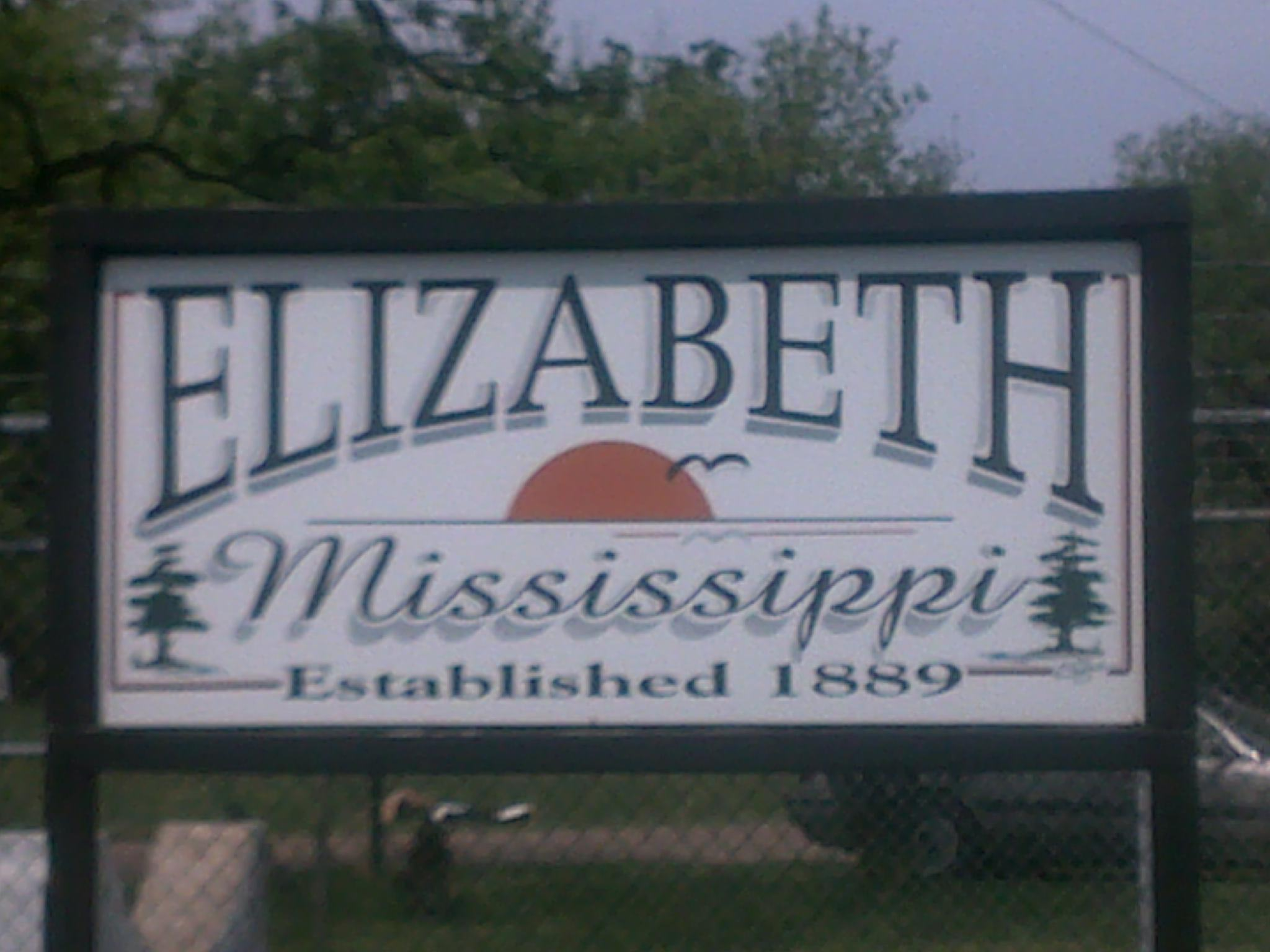
Elizabeth Mississippi community sign

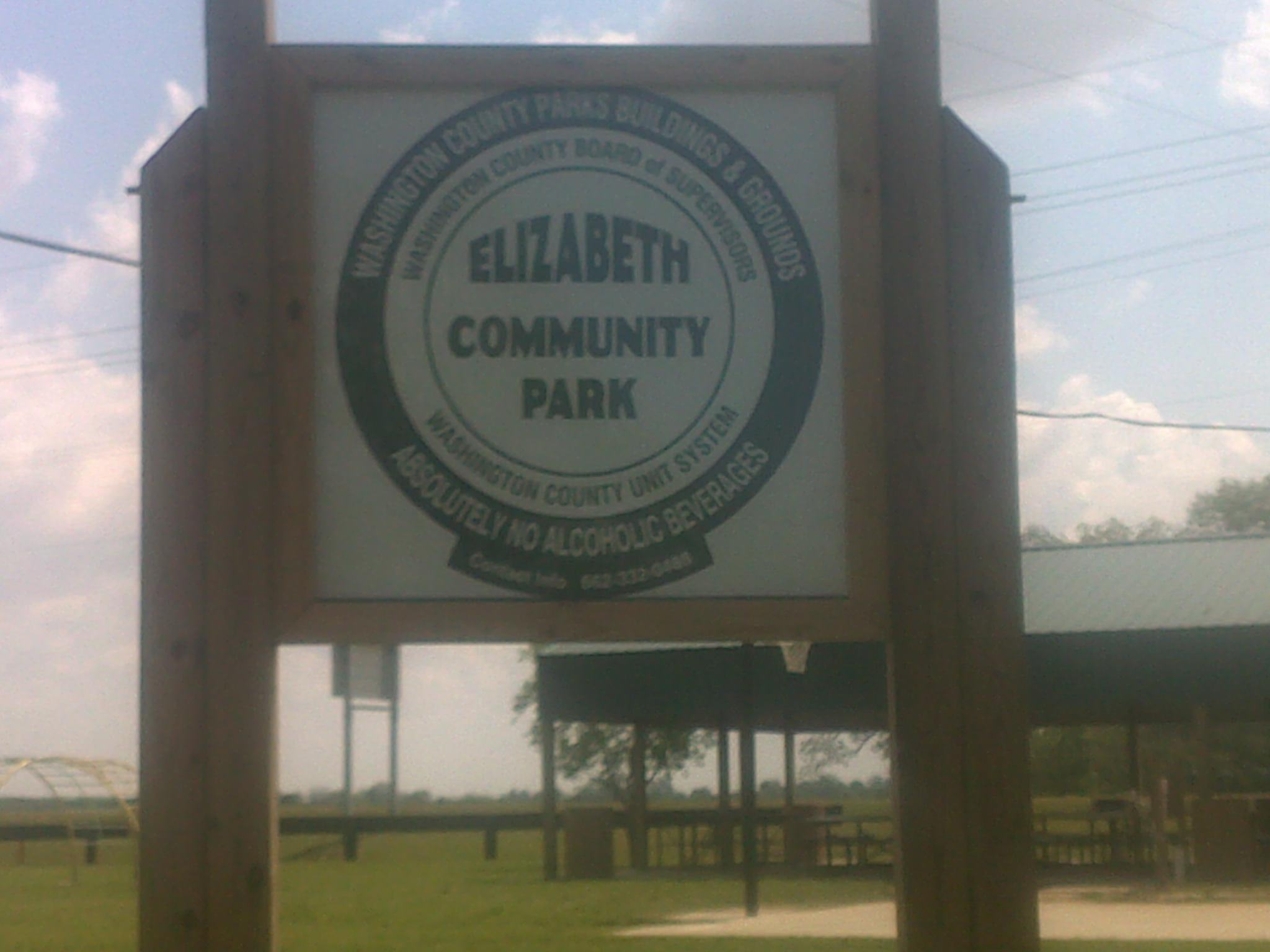
Community park in the Elizabeth community

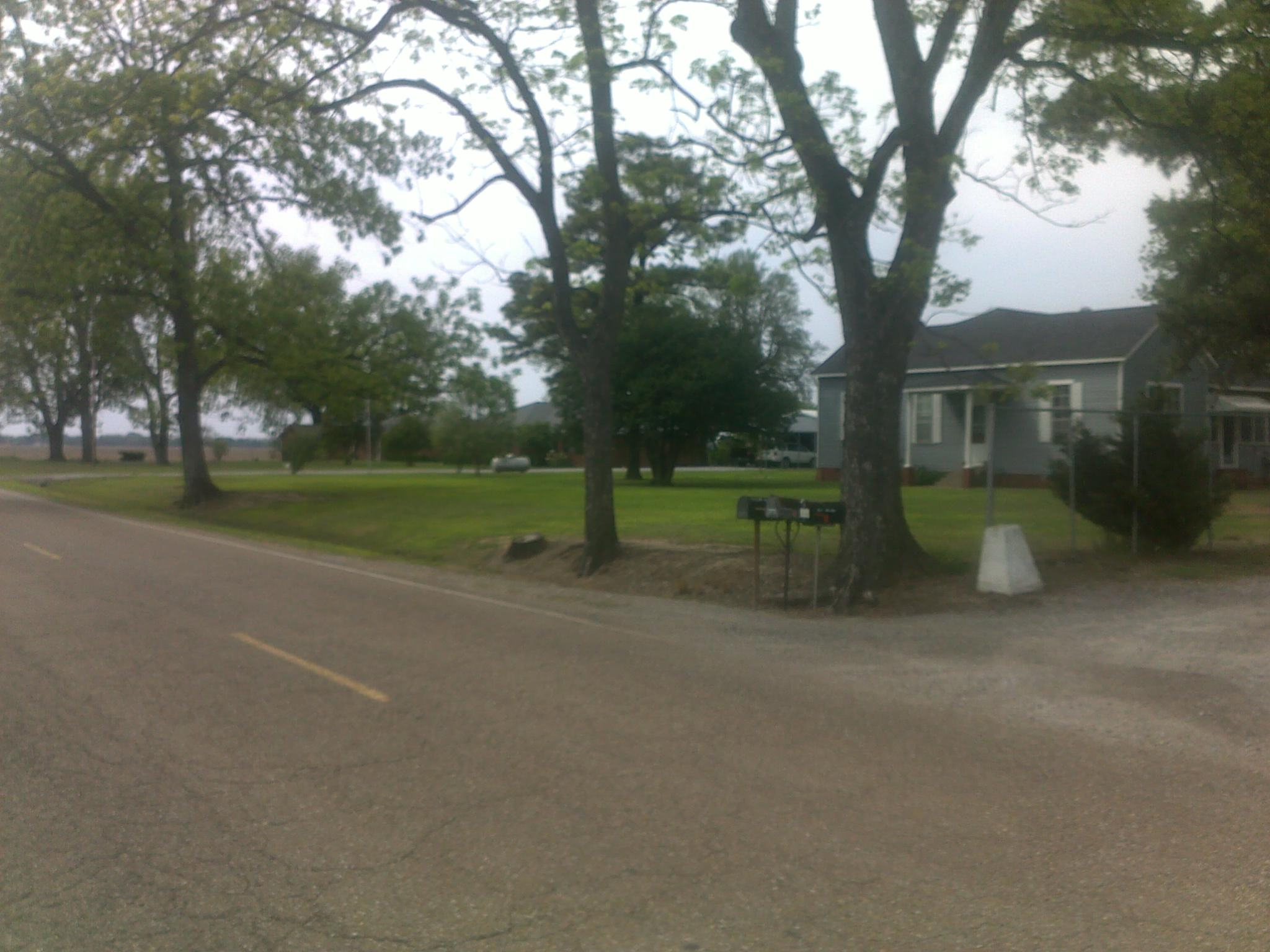
Homes In The Elizabeth community
