= Irene Scruggs =

American blues singer (1901–1981)

- Also known as: Chocolate Brown; Dixie Nolan
- Born: Irene Smith; December 7, 1901; Lamont, Bolivar County, Mississippi, United States
- Died: July 20, 1981 (aged 79) Trier, Rhineland-Palatinate, Germany
- Genres: Piedmont blues, country blues
- Occupations: Musician, songwriter
- Instrument: Vocals
- Years active: 1920s–1950s

Irene Scruggs (born Irene Smith, December 7, 1901 – July 20, 1981) was an American Piedmont blues and country blues singer, who was also billed as Chocolate Brown and Dixie Nolan. She recorded songs such as "My Back to the Wall" and "Good Grindin'" and worked with Clarence Williams, Joe "King" Oliver, Lonnie Johnson, Little Brother Montgomery, Blind Blake, Albert Nicholas, and Kid Ory. Scruggs achieved some success but today is largely forgotten.

== Biography ==
Born Irene Smith, she originated in rural Mississippi, but it is believed that she was raised in St. Louis, Missouri. Mary Lou Williams recalled Scruggs being a singer of some standing when Williams traveled to St. Louis in vaudeville. Scruggs was hired by the revue company, and her career there sometimes outshone her work as a recording artist and nightclub singer. This led to opportunities to sing with a number of Joe "King" Oliver's bands, which played in St. Louis in the mid-1920s. Scruggs was later accompanied by Blind Blake. In her live shows her song "Itching Heel" provided the platform for interplay between the Scruggs's singing and Blake's guitar work. "He don't do nothing but play on his old guitar," Scruggs sang, "While I'm busting suds out in the white folks' yard."

She first recorded for Okeh Records in 1924, with the pianist Clarence Williams. In 1926 she renewed her working association with Oliver. Two songs written by Scruggs, "Home Town Blues" and "Sorrow Valley Blues", were recorded by Oliver. She recorded again for Okeh in 1927, this time with Lonnie Johnson. Scruggs formed her own band in the late 1920s and performed regularly in the St. Louis area.

Using the pseudonym Chocolate Brown she recorded further tracks with Blind Blake. To avoid contractual problems she was also billed as Dixie Nolan. By the early 1930s, Little Brother Montgomery took over as her accompanist on recordings and in touring.

Scruggs also sang and recorded sexually explicit material. "Good Grindin'" and "Must Get Mine in Front" (1930) were the better-known examples of her dirty blues, and some of her work appeared in The Nasty Blues, published by the Hal Leonard Corporation. Scruggs recorded only a small batch of songs, and her recording career finished around 1935. In the 1940s, she left the United States for Europe, first settling in Paris and later relocating to Germany. In the 1950s, she undertook a number of BBC Radio broadcasts.

She died in Trier, Rhineland-Palatinate, Germany, in 1981, aged 79.

== See also ==
- List of country blues musicians
- List of Piedmont blues musicians
