= Murphy, Mississippi =

- Unincorporated community
- Location within Mississippi Location within the United States
- Coordinates: 33°07′15″N 90°42′05″W
- Country: United States
- State: Mississippi
- County: Washington
- Elevation: 102 ft (31 m)
- Time zone: UTC-6 (Central (CST))
  - Summer (DST): UTC-5 (CDT)
- ZIP code: 38748
- Area code: 662
- GNIS feature ID: 674474

Murphy is an unincorporated community located in Washington County, Mississippi. Murphy is approximately 15 miles (24 km) south of Kinlock and approximately 10 miles (16 km) east of Hollandale.
