= George B. Vogt =

American entomologist

- Born: April 10, 1920; Baltimore
- Died: December 12, 1990 (aged 70); Washington, D.C.
- Education: University of Maryland
- Scientific career
- Fields: Entomology
- Workplaces: PHS, USDA

George Britton Vogt (1920–1990) was an American entomologist and authority on longhorn beetles and leaf beetles.

== Education ==
George Vogt attended the University of Maryland, where he attained his Bachelor of Science degree in 1941, and Master of Science degree in 1949.

== Career ==
After he had been awarded his Bachelor of Science degree (in 1941), Vogt began his career in 1942, when he joined United States Public Health Service, appointed to World War II studies. Vogt was assigned as an entomologist in the Insect Detection and Identification Branch, United States Department of Agriculture (USDA), working on taxonomy in the United States National Museum.

From 1950 to 1952, Vogt went on several field expeditions, including the study in Burma, surveying mosquitos. In 1956, Vogt also searched for potential biological control agents for the Halogeton weed in Spain and southwest Asia. And from 1960 to 1962, he went on an expedition to South America to investigate the natural enemies of alligator weed. Vogt continued to work in the branch which was succeeded by the Systematic Entomology Laboratory. In 1972, Vogt was reassigned to the Southern Weed Science Lab, in Stoneville, Mississippi. In 1963 he was elected a Fellow of the American Association for the Advancement of Science.

In 1978, Vogt retired from the USDA, but continued his research in the Systematic Entomology Laboratory and Southern Weed Science Lab until his death in 1990.
