= Oronoco (steamboat) =

Exploded 1838, killing 100+

The Oronoco (also Oronoko) was a steamboat that operated in the 1830s. It carried passengers and goods along the Mississippi River. On the morning of April 12, 1838, captained by John Crawford, The Oronoco, anchored in the river just across from the town of Princeton about 100 miles (160 km) north of Vicksburg. The steamboat stopped with the intention of picking up more passengers.

The ship was packed tightly with sleeping passengers as it was still quite early. Majority of the passengers slept in between the ship's two decks in the apartment covered with mattresses to maximize capacity. The ship remained anchored with the engine off and boilers tended, when suddenly, ship's flue collapsed, sending forceful gusts of steam through the ship. People on the deck were blown overboard while the steam infiltrated the apartment full of sleeping passengers, harming most. Frantically, people jumped off the ship into the river where they attempted to swim ashore. Those in the cabin below remained mostly unharmed, but the event caused almost 100 casualties mostly consisting of burn victims and those who drowned in the river.

This was a common event in the 1830s with the new technology of the steam engine. Because of other steam boiler explosions within a year of the Oronoco, the Federal Government stepped in and began regulating steam powered vehicles.

Among the victims were eight enslaved horse jockeys and grooms owned by Colonel Oliver of Louisville, Kentucky, as well as a racehorse in their care, that was called Joe Kearney, and was worth US$3,000 (equivalent to $90,703 in 2025).
