= Rocket Watts =

American basketball player

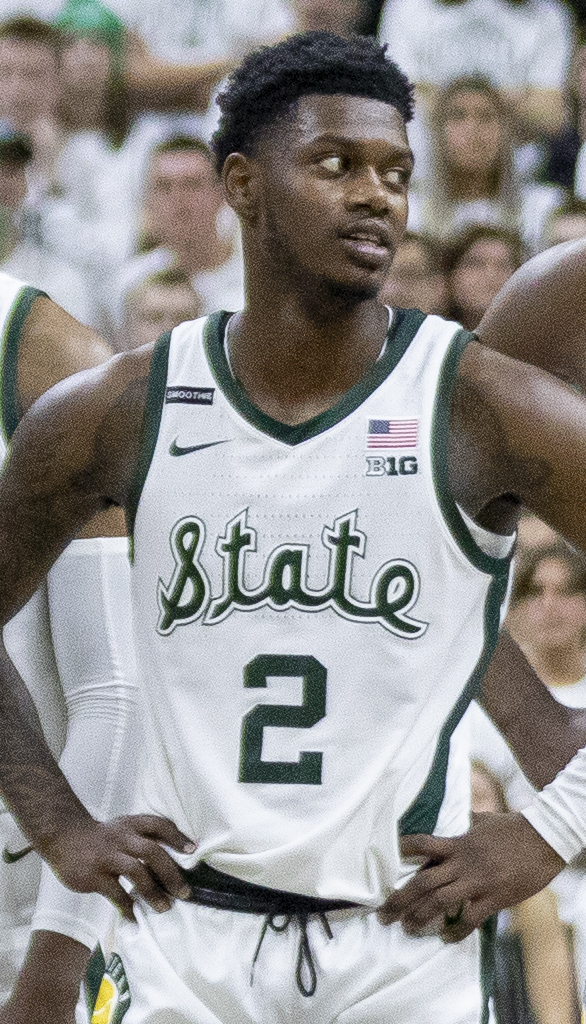
- Watts in 2020

BK Iskra Svit
- Position: Point guard / shooting guard
- League: Slovak Basketball league

Personal information
- Born: June 1, 2000 (age 26) Detroit, Michigan, U.S.
- Listed height: 6 ft 2 in (1.88 m)
- Listed weight: 185 lb (84 kg)

Career information
- High school: Allen Academy (Detroit, Michigan); Old Redford Academy (Detroit, Michigan); SPIRE Academy (Geneva, Ohio)
- College: Michigan State (2019–2021); Mississippi State (2021–2022); Oakland (2022–2024)
- NBA draft: 2024: undrafted
- Playing career: 2024–present

Career history
- 2025–present: Iskra Svit

Career highlights
- Big Ten All-Freshman Team (2020)
Medals
Men's basketball
Representing the United States
FIBA Americas U18 Championship
Gold medal – first place	2018 Canada	Team

Mark A. "Rocket" Watts Jr. (born June 1, 2000) is an American professional basketball player who is currently a guard for BK Iskra Svit of the Slovak Basketball League. He played college basketball for the Oakland Golden Grizzlies, the Michigan State Spartans and the Mississippi State Bulldogs.

== Early life ==
Watts spent his first year of high school with Allen Academy in Detroit, Michigan. As a freshman, he averaged 14.1 points and led his team to a 19–3 record. After Allen Academy closed, Watts transferred to Old Redford Academy in Detroit for his next two years. While at the school, he also played with The Family Detroit on the Amateur Athletic Union (AAU) circuit. In his sophomore season, Watts averaged 25.6 points, 6.2 assists, and 2.8 steals per game and earned Detroit News second-team All-Area honors.

As a junior, Watts averaged 26.8 points, 5.6 rebounds, 5.4 assists, and 3.1 steals per game, helping Old Redford Academy to a 19–6 record. He was a Detroit News first-team All-Area pick. Watts was named first-team All-State in each of his first three seasons. For his senior season, Watts transferred with LaMelo Ball to SPIRE Institute and Academy, a boarding prep school in Geneva, Ohio. On January 26, 2019, he scored a career-high 64 points, with 15 three-pointers, in a win over St. Edward High School. Watts, on April 29, played in the Jordan Brand Classic all-star game.

By the end of his high school career, Watts was a consensus four-star recruit and top-40 player in the 2019 class. On September 22, 2018, he verbally committed to play college basketball for Michigan State. Watts had been recruited by Michigan State head coach Tom Izzo since eighth grade.

College recruiting
Name	Hometown	School	Height	Weight	Commit date
Rocket Watts; PG / SG	Detroit, MI	SPIRE Academy (OH)	6 ft 2 in (1.88 m)	175 lb (79 kg)	Sep 22, 2018
Rocket Watts; PG / SG	Recruit ratings: Rivals: 247Sports: ESPN: (89)				
Overall recruit ranking: Rivals: 38 247Sports: 39 ESPN: 33
Note: In many cases, Scout, Rivals, 247Sports, On3, and ESPN may conflict in their listings of height and weight.; In these cases, the average was taken. ESPN grades are on a 100-point scale.; Sources: "Michigan State 2019 Basketball Commitments". Rivals.; "2019 Michigan State Spartans Recruiting Class". ESPN.; "2019 Team Ranking". Rivals.

== College career ==
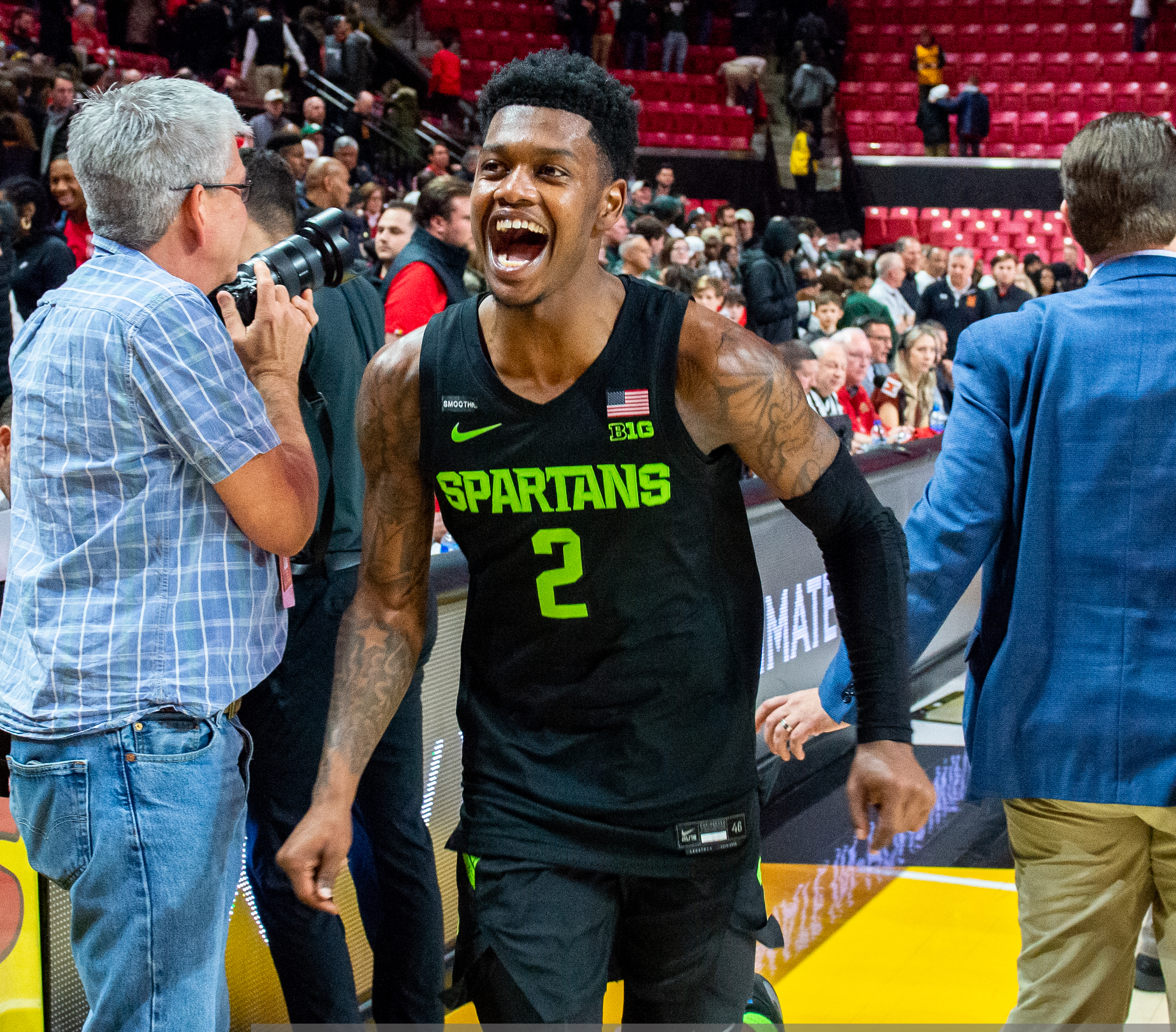
Watts in February 2020

=== 2019–20 season ===
Watts started his first career game on November 5, 2019, in place of the injured Joshua Langford against Kentucky. He was held scoreless, going 0-of-4 from the field while picking up 2 assists in 22 minutes played in the 62–69 loss. Five days later, Watts collected his first career points, finishing with 5 in 23 minutes as the Spartans defeated Binghamton 100–46. On November 18, 2019, Watts recorded a then-career-high 11 points to go with another career-high 7 total rebounds as the Spartans routed Charleston Southern 94–46. Watts suffered a leg injury in December 2019 and was forced to miss some time. At the time, he was averaging 6.5 points per game. On February 11, 2020, Watts scored a season-high 21 points in a 70–69 win against Illinois. He tied that mark of 21 points the next game, leading the team in scoring on February 25, 2020 as the Spartans won against (then) higher-ranked Iowa, 78–70. Watts played a crucial role in the Spartans' game against Penn State on March 3, as they came back from a 15-point deficit at half to win by 8. He put up 18 points, second on the team that night. On March 8, Watts finished second on the team with 19 points in an 80–69 win over Ohio State. At the close of the regular season, Watts was named to the Big Ten All-Freshman Team.

=== 2020–21 season ===
Watts tipped off his sophomore campaign by coming off the bench for 23 minutes, recording two points and three assists for Michigan State in a 83–67 win against Eastern Michigan. In his next game, an 80–70 win against Notre Dame, Watts scored 13 points in his 20 minutes off the bench, good enough for second on the team that night. In addition, he tied his career high of 6 assists. In the Spartans 75–69 upset of Duke, Watts received his first start of the season. He responded by leading the team in scoring with 20 points, including three crucial, late free throws to help stave off a Blue Devils comeback. The next game, a 83–76 Spartan victory over Detroit Mercy, Watts once again received the start and led the team with a career-high 23 points. He followed that up with 10 points and 6 assists in his third start on the season, a 79–61 win over Western Michigan. In the next game against Oakland, Watts ran into foul trouble early and wound up with 9 points in 22 minutes as the Spartans won 109–91 to improve to 6–0 on the season. In the Spartans first loss of the year, a 79–65 loss to Northwestern, Watts was ice cold, only scoring 5 points, all of which were in the final 4 minutes. Watts continued to struggle against Wisconsin, only scoring 5 points in 26 minutes as the Spartans dropped to 0–2 in conference, losing 85–76. He did set a new career high with 7 assists, however. In the next game, an 81–56 loss against Minnesota, Watts only scored 2 points.

On December 31, 2020, Spartans coach Tom Izzo stated that Watts would be moving back to his 'natural' position at shooting guard instead of point guard.

In MSU's first conference win of the year, an 84–77 triumph over Nebraska, Watts scored 9 points coming off the bench, with two late free throws helping finish off the Cornhuskers.

On March 29, 2021, Watts entered the NCAA transfer portal thereby ending his career with the Spartans, ultimately transferring to Mississippi State.

=== 2021–22 season ===
Watts was limited to 19 games as a junior due to injuries to his hip and elbow. He averaged 4.4 points per game while shooting 40.2 percent from the floor and 26.7 percent from beyond the arc. After the season, coach Ben Howland was fired and Watts opted to transfer to Oakland for his senior season.

== Professional career ==
Watts went undrafted in the 2024 NBA draft.

=== BK Iskra Svit ===
On July 24, 2025, Watts signed with BK Iskra Svit of the Slovak Basketball League.

== National team career ==
Watts played for the United States under-18 basketball team at the 2018 FIBA Under-18 Americas Championship. He helped his team win the gold medal, averaging 6.8 points and 2.5 assists per game.

== Career statistics ==
Legend
GP	Games played	GS	Games started	MPG	Minutes per game
FG%	Field goal percentage	3P%	3-point field goal percentage	FT%	Free throw percentage
RPG	Rebounds per game	APG	Assists per game	SPG	Steals per game
BPG	Blocks per game	PPG	Points per game	**Bold**	Career high

=== College ===
Year	Team	GP	GS	MPG	FG%	3P%	FT%	RPG	APG	SPG	BPG	PPG
2019–20	Michigan State	27	**16**	22.3	**.389**	**.281**	**.800**	**2.3**	1.7	**.5**	.0	**9.0**
2020–21	Michigan State	**28**	15	**22.6**	.336	.253	.780	1.7	**2.7**	.1	.0	7.7
Career		55	31	22.5	.363	.269	.789	2.0	2.2	.3	.0	8.4

== Personal life ==
Watts was given the nickname "Rocket" while playing football at age five. His father Mark Sr. originally owned the nickname for the speed he displayed while playing high school football.
