= Winterville, Mississippi =

- Census-designated place
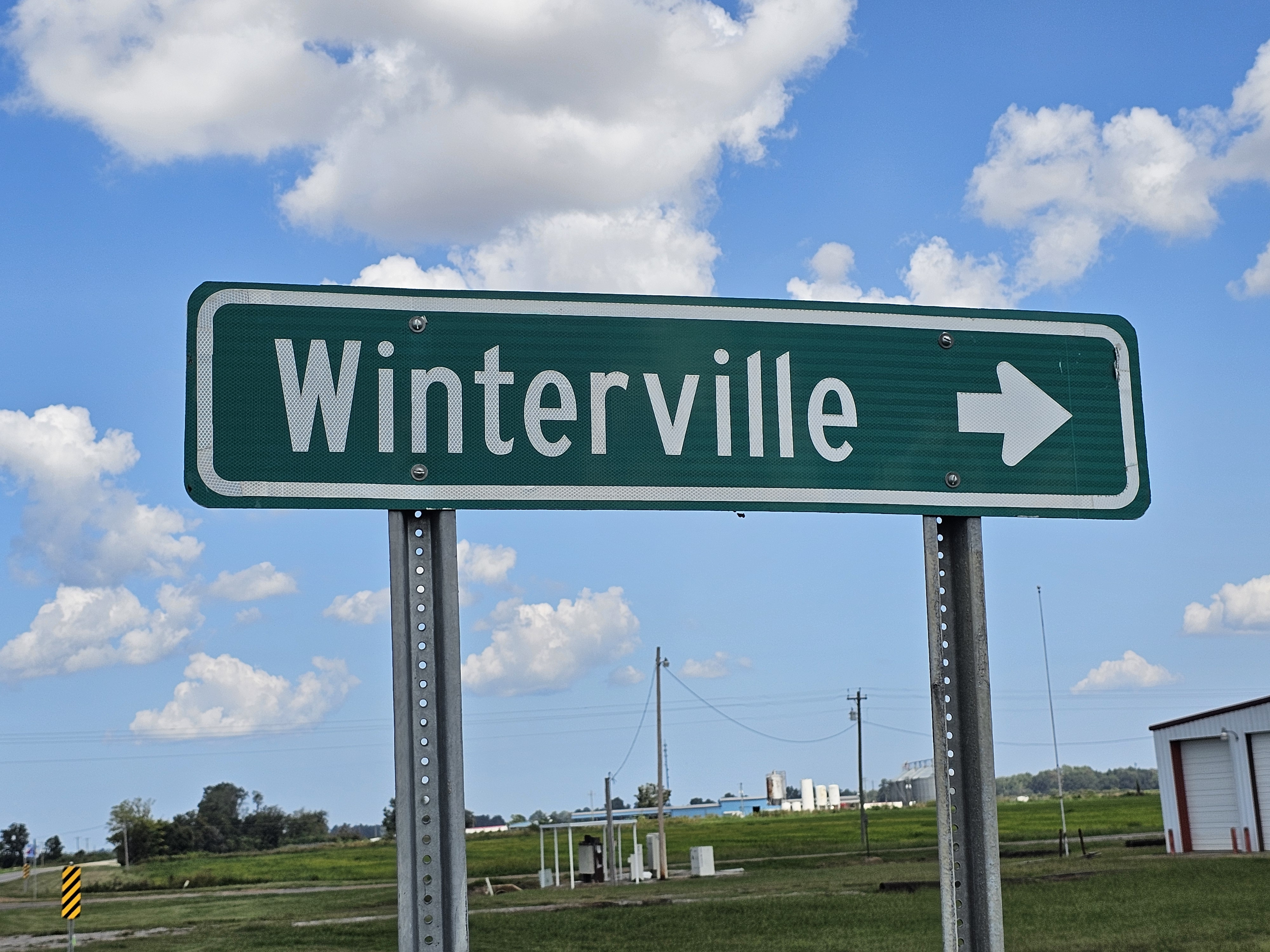
- Highway sign just outside of Winterville, Mississippi

- Location within Mississippi Location within the United States
- Coordinates: 33°29′54″N 91°03′34″W
- Country: United States
- State: Mississippi
- County: Washington

Area
  - Total: 2.56 sq mi (6.63 km^{2})
  - Land: 2.56 sq mi (6.63 km^{2})
  - Water: 0 sq mi (0.00 km^{2})
- Elevation: 131 ft (40 m)

Population (2020)
  - Total: 96
  - Density: 37.5/sq mi (14.48/km^{2})
- Time zone: UTC-6 (Central (CST))
  - Summer (DST): UTC-5 (CDT)
- ZIP code: 38782
- Area code: 662
- GNIS feature ID: 2812754

Winterville is a census-designated place (CDP) and unincorporated community located in Washington County, Mississippi, near Mississippi Highway 1. Winterville is approximately 3 miles (4.8 km) north of Greenville, the county seat, and approximately 4 miles (6.4 km) south of Lamont.

The Winterville site, a National Historic Landmark featuring more than twelve major earthwork mounds from the period of 11th to 15th centuries, is located near Winterville along Mississippi 1. It is the type site of the Plaquemine Mississippian culture, from which the Natchez Indians descended. Preceding cultures also constructed mounds in this area.

Per the 2020 Census, the population was 96.

== Demographics ==
Historical population
Census	Pop.	Note	%±
2020	96		—
U.S. Decennial Census; 2020

Winterville was first listed as a census designated place in the 2020 U.S. census.

Winterville CDP, Mississippi – Racial and ethnic composition Note: the US Census treats Hispanic/Latino as an ethnic category. This table excludes Latinos from the racial categories and assigns them to a separate category. Hispanics/Latinos may be of any race.
Race / Ethnicity (NH = Non-Hispanic)	Pop 2020	% 2020
White alone (NH)	10	10.42%
Black or African American alone (NH)	84	87.50%
Native American or Alaska Native alone (NH)	0	0.00%
Asian alone (NH)	0	0.00%
Pacific Islander alone (NH)	0	0.00%
Other race alone (NH)	0	0.00%
Mixed race or Multiracial (NH)	1	1.04%
Hispanic or Latino (any race)	1	1.04%
Total	96	100.00%

== Education ==
It is in the Western Line School District.
