= Tribbett, Mississippi =

- Unincorporated community
- Location within Mississippi Location within the United States
- Coordinates: 33°21′05″N 90°47′54″W
- Country: United States
- State: Mississippi
- County: Washington
- Elevation: 122 ft (37 m)
- Time zone: UTC-6 (Central (CST))
  - Summer (DST): UTC-5 (CDT)
- ZIP code: 38779
- Area code: 662
- GNIS feature ID: 678871

Tribbett is an unincorporated community located in Washington County, Mississippi. Tribbett is approximately 10 miles (16 km) northeast of Arcola and 8 miles (13 km) southeast of Leland.

Tribbett is home to Six Mile Farms, LLC, the only commercial popcorn company in Mississippi. Six Mile Farms grows, processes and packages Crop to Pop popcorn.
