= Riverside High School (Mississippi) =

School in Mississippi, United States

Coordinates: 33.2273°N 91.0455°W

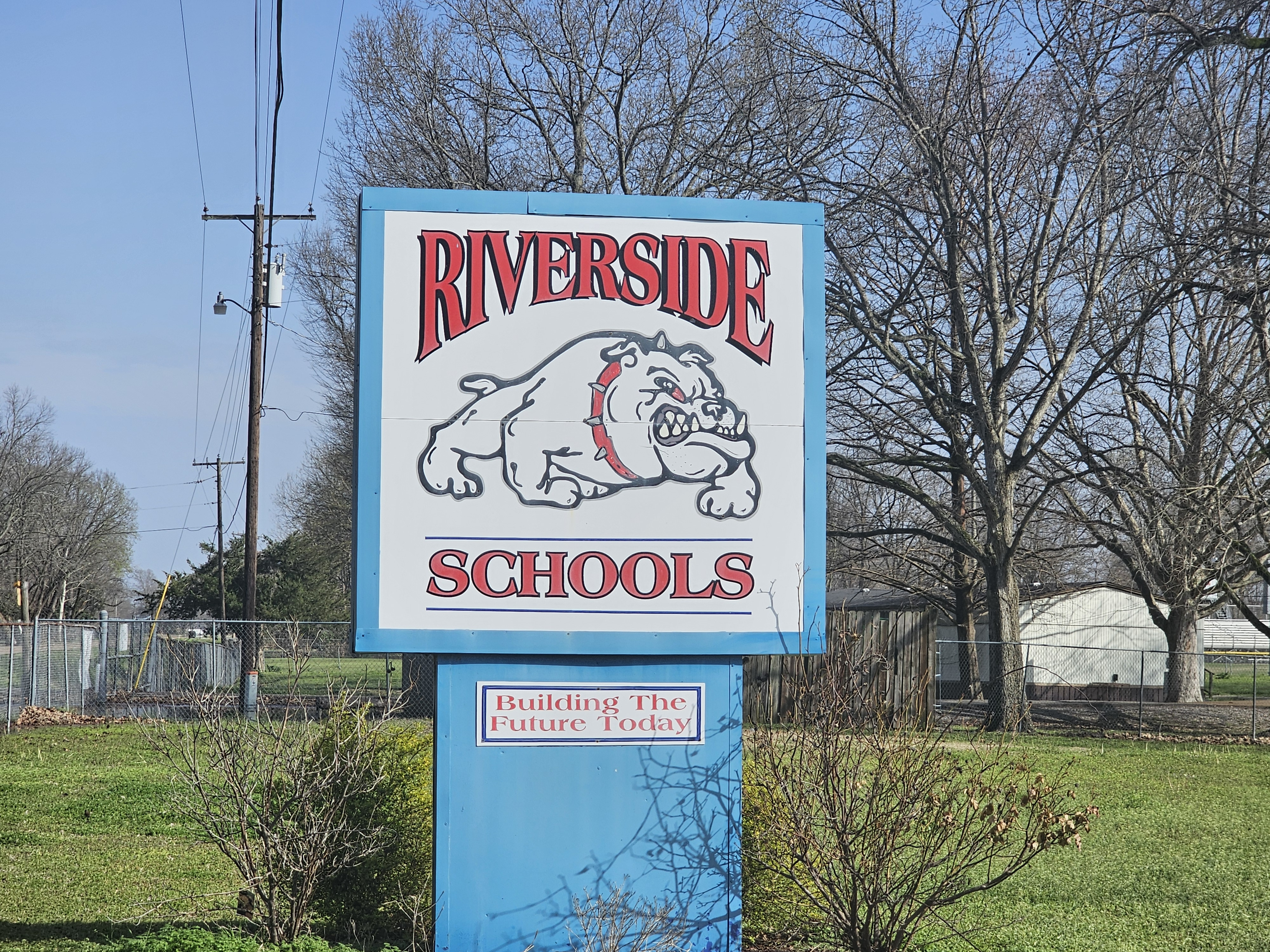
- Sign for the Riverside schools campus, which includes Riverside High School
- 939 Riverside Rd. Avon, MS 38723; United States

Information
- Principal: Shawneequa Beal
- Staff: 25.20 (FTE)
- Grades: 1–12
- Enrollment: 363 (2023–2024)
- Student to teacher ratio: 14.40
- Campus type: Rural
- Color
- Team name: Bulldogs
- Website: www.westernline.org/riversidehigh

Riverside High School is a senior high school in Avon, Mississippi. It is a part of the Western Line School District. It serves Elementary through High School.

== Notable alumni ==
- D.J. Stewart Jr. (2018), basketball player who plays professionally in Slovenia
