= Western Line School District =

School district in Mississippi

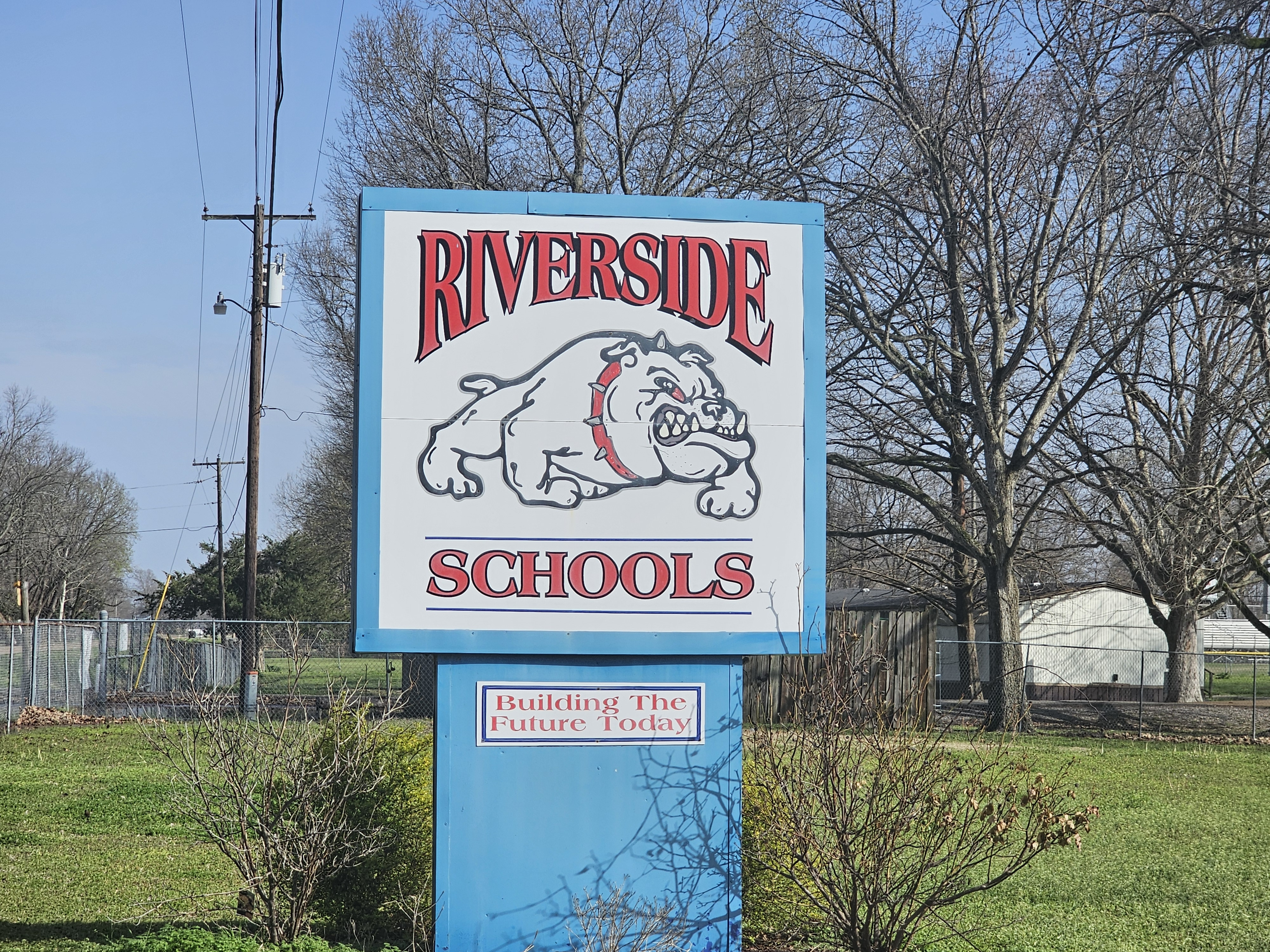
Sign for the Riverside schools campus, which includes Riverside High School

The Western Line School District (WLSD) is a public school district based in the community of Avon, Mississippi (USA).

In addition to Avon, the district serves the town of Metcalfe, a small portion of Greenville, as well as the unincorporated communities of Glen Allan and Winterville in Washington County. A small portion of northwestern Issaquena County lies within the district, including a section of Grace. It also serves Wayside.

The district was established in 1957.

== Schools ==
- O'Bannon High School
- Riverside High School
- O'Bannon Elementary School
- Riverside Elementary School
  - Its Kindergarten classes are in the Morris Center Campus

Former schools:

- Skidsboro Junior High School

== Demographics ==
=== 2007-08 school year ===
As of the 2023–2024 school year, there were 1,714 students enrolled in the Western Line School District across grades pre-kindergarten through 12, a five percent increase over the prior year. The gender makeup of the district was 50% female and 50% male. The racial makeup was 67.1% African American, 27.9% White, 2.7% Hispanic, 1.9% two or more races, and 0.4% Asian. Approximately 99.9% of students qualify for the federal free and reduced-price meal program.

=== Previous school years ===
School Year	Enrollment	Gender Makeup		Racial Makeup				
School Year	Enrollment	Female	Male	Asian	African American	Hispanic	Native American	White
2006-07	2,044	46%	54%	0.34%	52.05%	2.30%	0.05%	45.25%
2005-06	2,073	47%	53%	0.34%	52.00%	1.74%	–	45.92%
2004-05	2,069	47%	53%	0.48%	50.94%	1.59%	–	46.98%
2003-04	2,050	46%	54%	0.49%	50.83%	1.46%	–	47.22%
2002-03	2,090	47%	53%	0.43%	53.16%	1.29%	0.38%	44.74%

== Accountability statistics ==
	2007-08	2006-07	2005-06	2004-05	2003-04	2002-03
District Accreditation Status	Accredited	Accredited	Accredited	Accredited	Accredited	Accredited
School Performance Classifications
Level 5 (Superior Performing) Schools	No School; Performance; Classifications; Assigned	0	0	0	0	0
Level 4 (Exemplary) Schools	No School; Performance; Classifications; Assigned	2	2	3	2	2
Level 3 (Successful) Schools	No School; Performance; Classifications; Assigned	2	2	2	2	2
Level 2 (Under Performing) Schools	No School; Performance; Classifications; Assigned	0	0	0	1	1
Level 1 (Low Performing) Schools	No School; Performance; Classifications; Assigned	0	0	0	0	0
Not Assigned	No School; Performance; Classifications; Assigned	0	0	0	0	0

== See also ==
- Givhan v. Western Line Consolidated School District
- List of school districts in Mississippi
