= Burdett, Mississippi =

- Unincorporated community
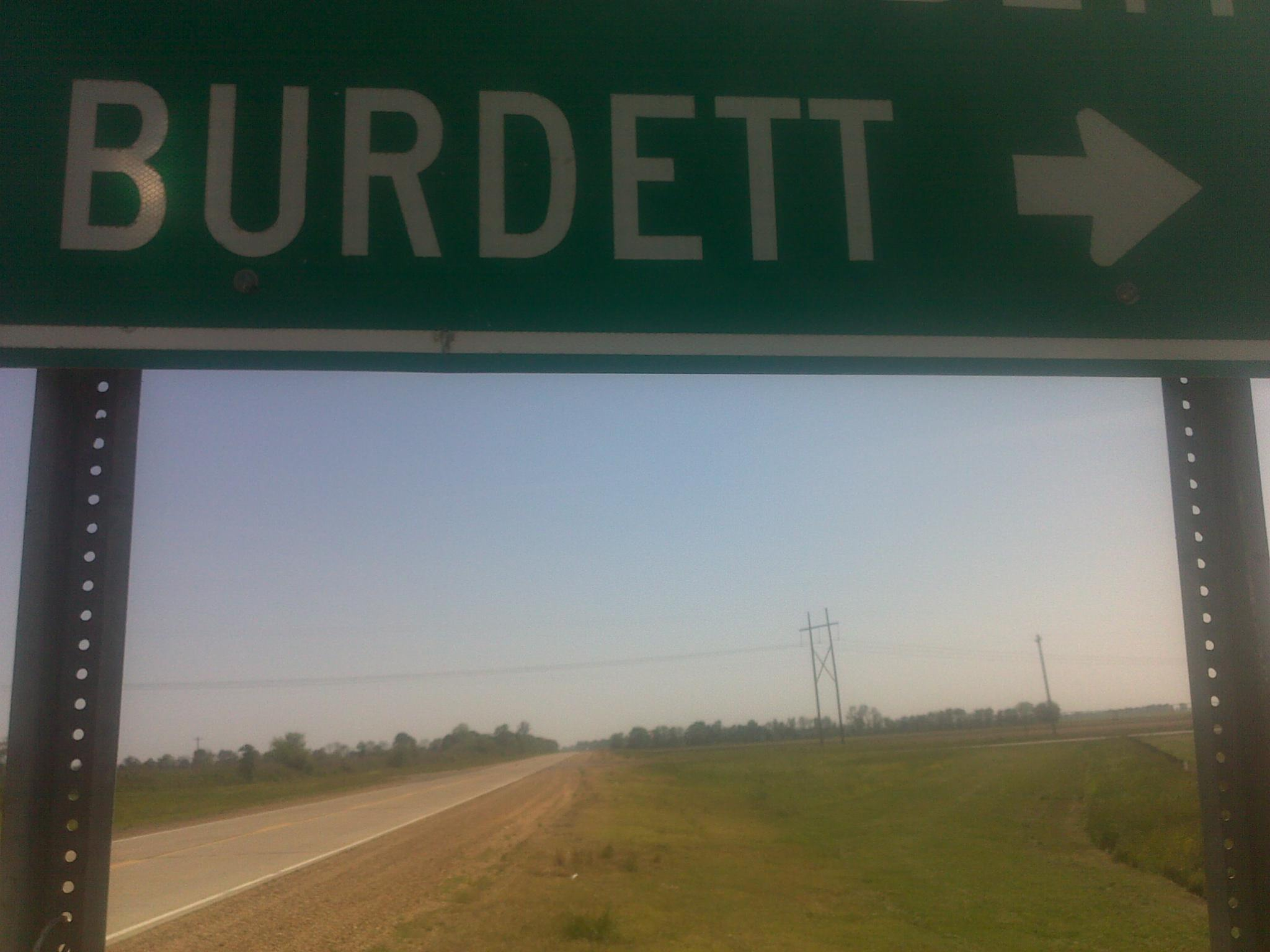
- Highway Sign in Burdett

- Location within Mississippi Location within the United States
- Coordinates: 33°20′54″N 90°54′53″W
- Country: United States
- State: Mississippi
- County: Washington
- Elevation: 138 ft (42 m)
- Time zone: UTC-6 (Central (CST))
  - Summer (DST): UTC-5 (CDT)
- ZIP code: 38756
- Area code: 662
- GNIS feature ID: 667797

Burdett is an unincorporated community in Washington County, Mississippi. Burdett is near Old Highway 61 on Burdett Road and is approximately 10 miles (16 km) north-northwest of Arcola and approximately 6 miles (9.7 km) south-southwest of Leland.
