= New Mexico, Mississippi =

- Ghost town
- Location within the state of Mississippi
- Coordinates: 32°58′40″N 91°05′11″W
- Country: United States
- State: Mississippi
- County: Washington
- Time zone: UTC-6 (Central (CST))
  - Summer (DST): UTC-5 (CDT)

New Mexico is a ghost town located in present-day Issaquena County, Mississippi, United States. New Mexico became extinct prior to the creation of Issaquena County in 1844, so the settlement existed only within Washington County, Mississippi.

Located directly on the Mississippi River, New Mexico was the first county seat of Washington County.

In 1827 the United States Congress established a post road from New Mexico to the courthouse in Yazoo County, Mississippi.

In 1830, Princeton was named the county seat after New Mexico "caved into the river".

== Location and description ==
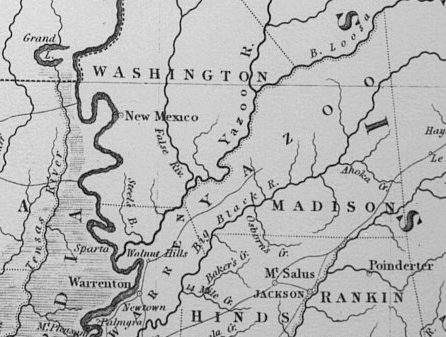
A map of Washington County from 1828 showing New Mexico slightly below the 33rd circle of latitude

Swiss water-colorist Karl Bodmer traveled down the Mississippi River in the 1820s, and recorded New Mexico's location as "below the mouth of the Arkansas River". Bodmer painted New Mexico on the Mississippi, depicting the settlement's inhabitants and layout.

Historians have stated that New Mexico was located near present-day Mayersville.
