= Port Anderson, Mississippi =

- Ghost town
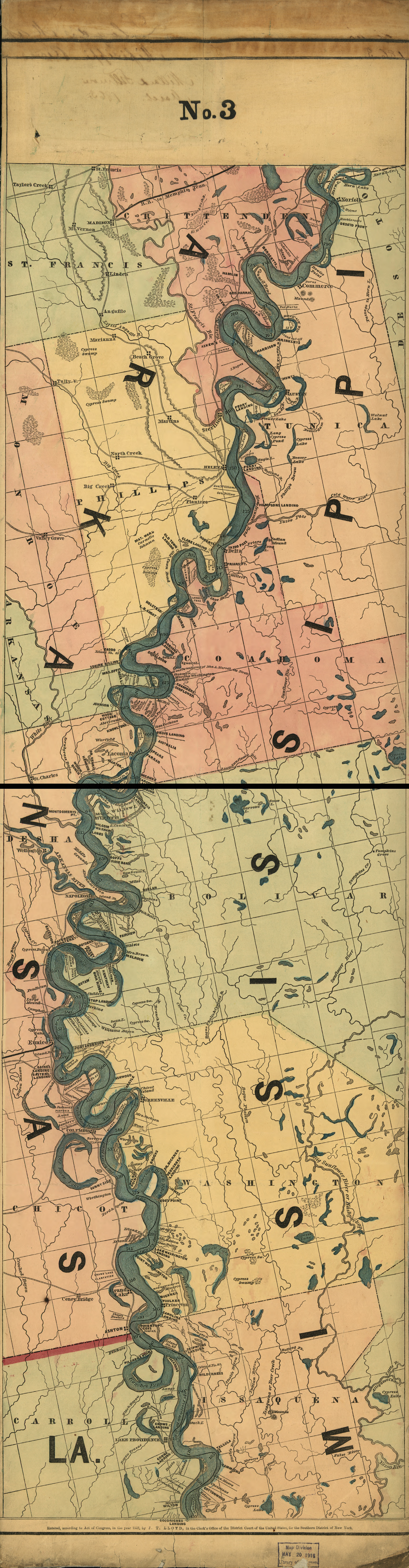
- 1862 map showing Port Anderson

- Location within the state of Mississippi Port Anderson, Mississippi (the United States)
- Coordinates: 33°31′33″N 91°12′06″W
- Country: United States
- State: Mississippi
- County: Washington
- Elevation: 102 ft (31 m)
- Time zone: UTC-6 (Central (CST))
  - Summer (DST): UTC-5 (CDT)
- GNIS feature ID: 687289

Port Anderson is a ghost town in Washington County, Mississippi, United States.

== History ==
The area was settled around 1820 on the banks of the Mississippi River by Major John Lewis Martin (a nephew of Meriwether Lewis), and his son-in-law, John Anderson. Using slave labor, they established a successful plantation there.

Port Anderson is today covered by the Mississippi River, and the nearby shore is uninhabited bottomland.
