= Percy, Mississippi =

- Unincorporated community
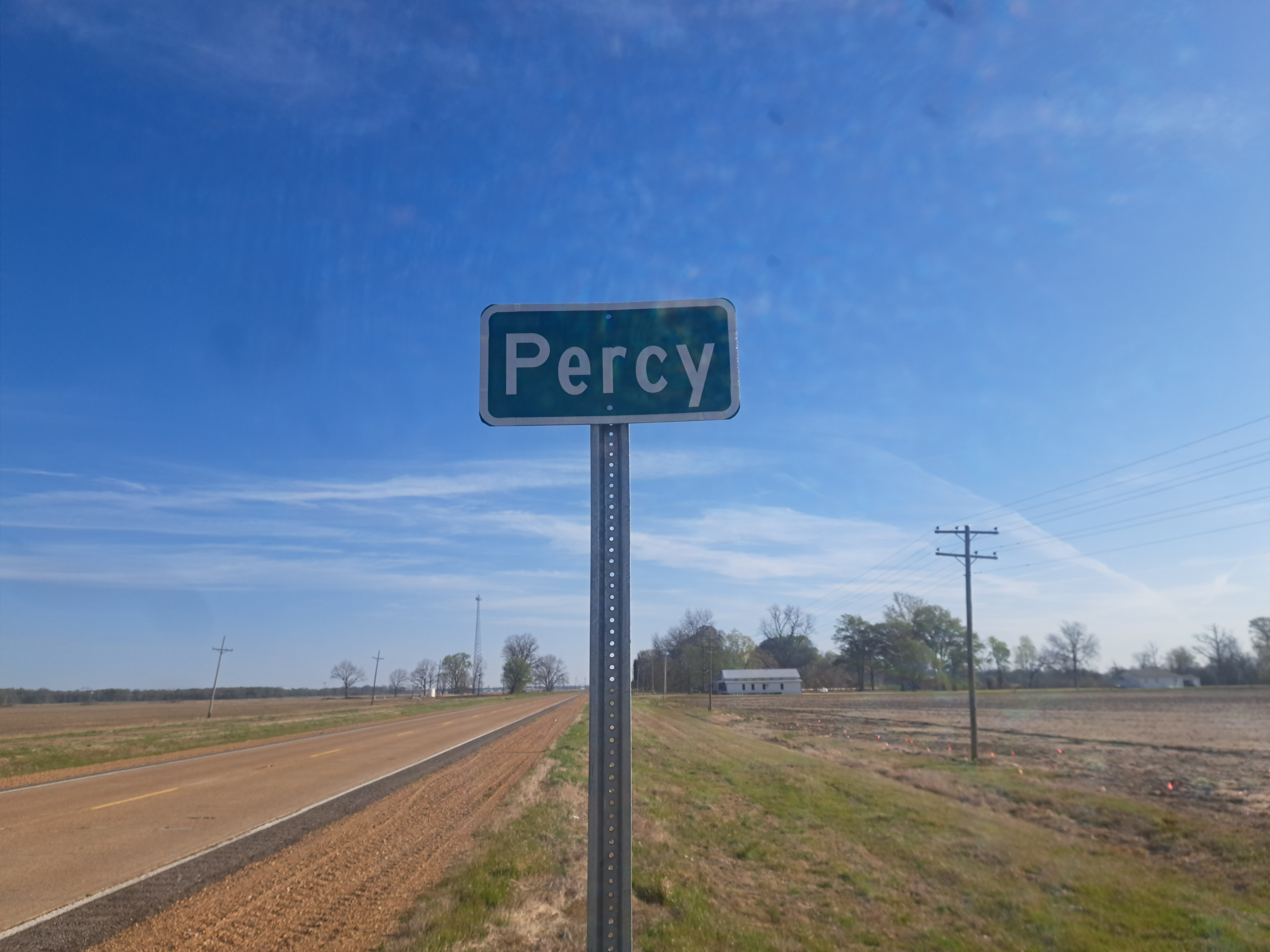
- Highway Sign in Percy

- Location within Mississippi Location within the United States
- Coordinates: 33°06′32″N 90°52′46″W
- Country: United States
- State: Mississippi
- County: Washington
- Elevation: 115 ft (35 m)
- Time zone: UTC-6 (Central (CST))
  - Summer (DST): UTC-5 (CDT)
- ZIP code: 38748
- Area code: 662
- GNIS feature ID: 692138

Percy is an unincorporated community in Washington County, Mississippi, United States. Percy is approximately 3.3 miles (5.3 km) north of Panther Burn and 4.7 miles (7.6 km) south of Hollandale along U.S. Route 61.
