= Avon, Mississippi =

Unincorporated community in Mississippi, US

- Unincorporated community
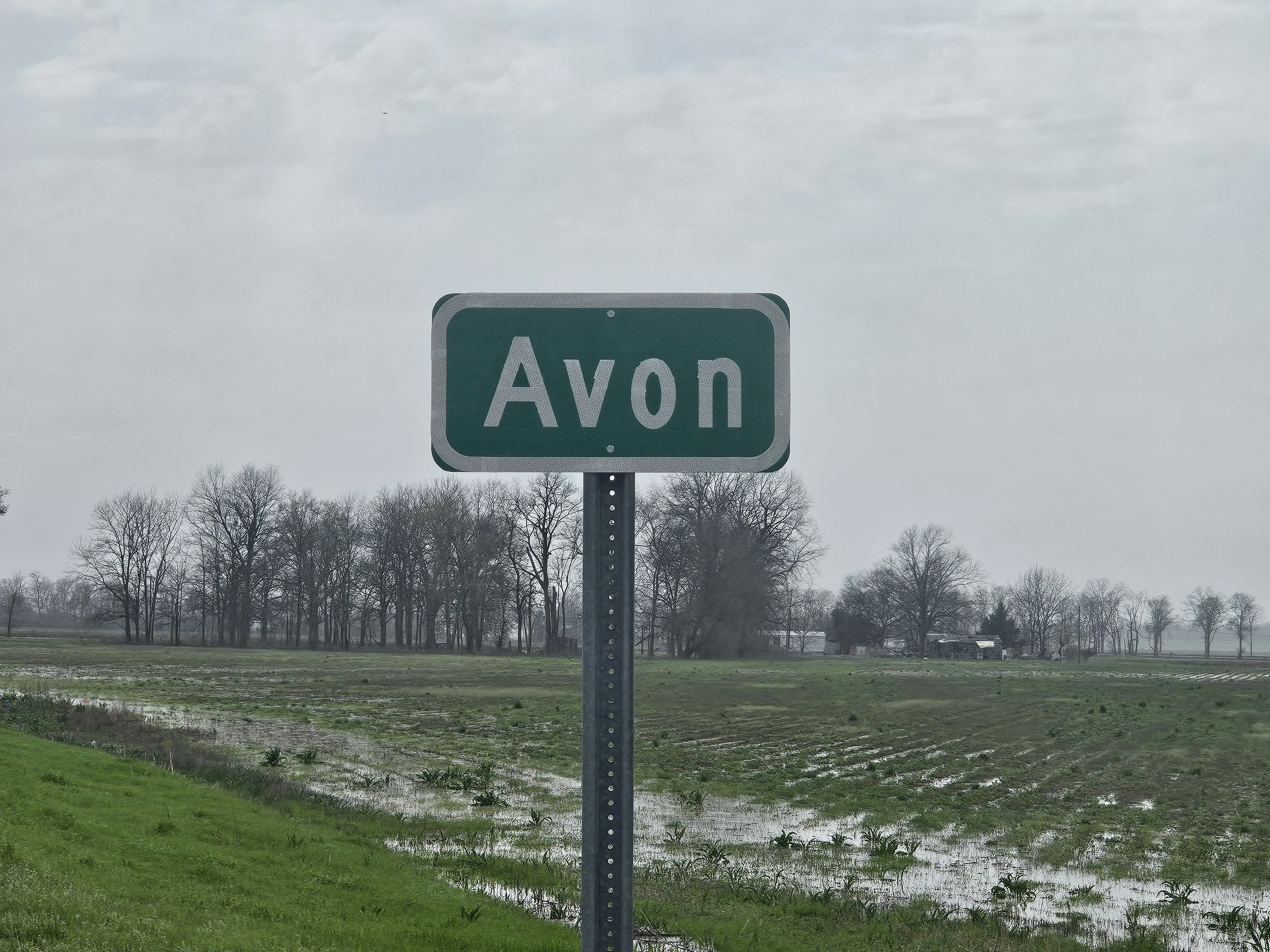
- Highway Sign outside Avon

- Location within Mississippi
- Coordinates: 33°13′48″N 91°02′50″W
- Country: United States
- State: Mississippi
- County: Washington
- Elevation: 115 ft (35 m)
- Postal code: 38723
- GNIS feature ID: 666436

Avon is an unincorporated community located along Highway 1 in southwestern Washington County, Mississippi, US.

It has a post office, with the ZIP code 38723.

== Gallery ==
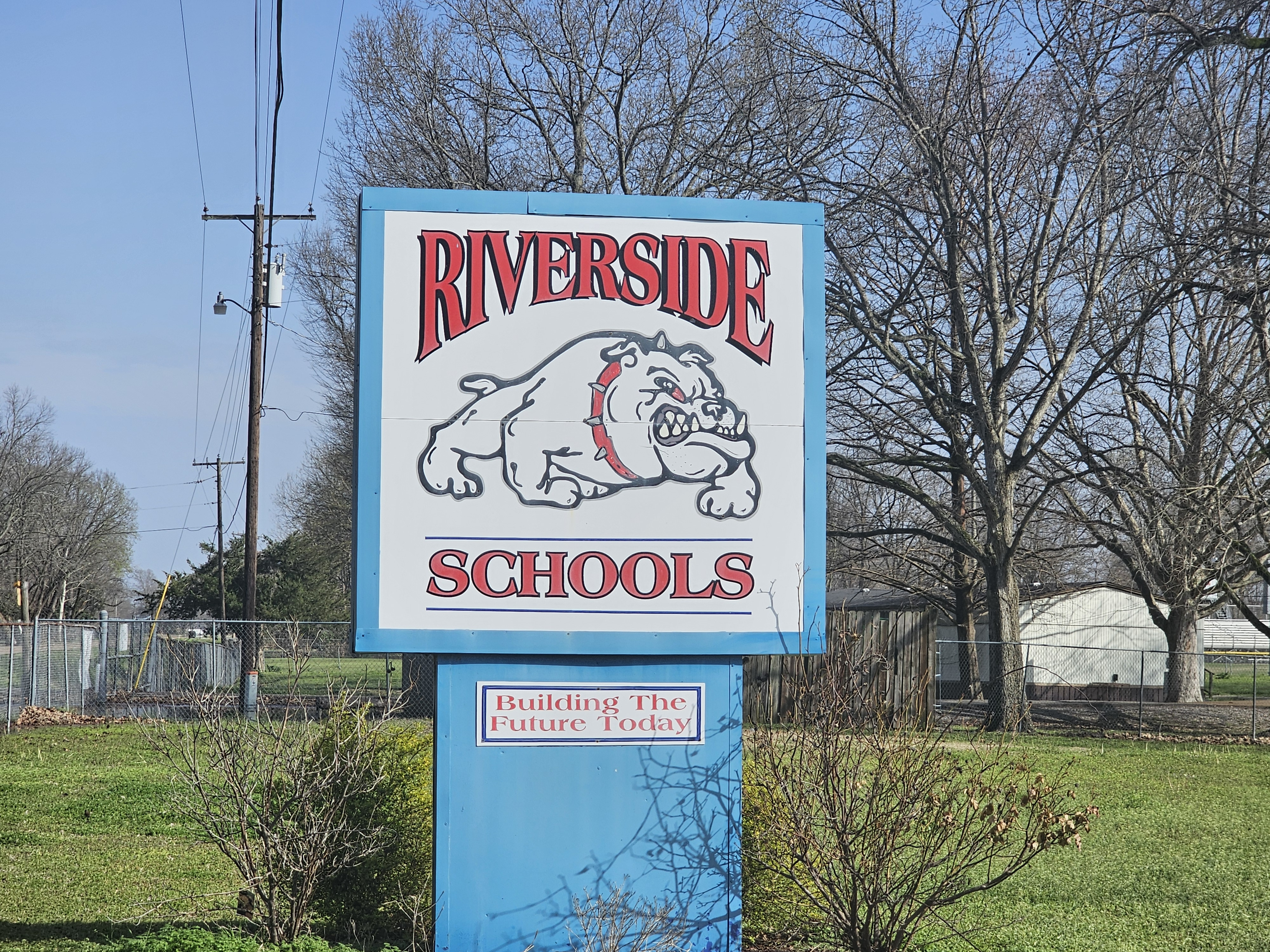
Sign for the Riverside schools campus of the Western Line School District, which includes Riverside Elementary School and Riverside High School

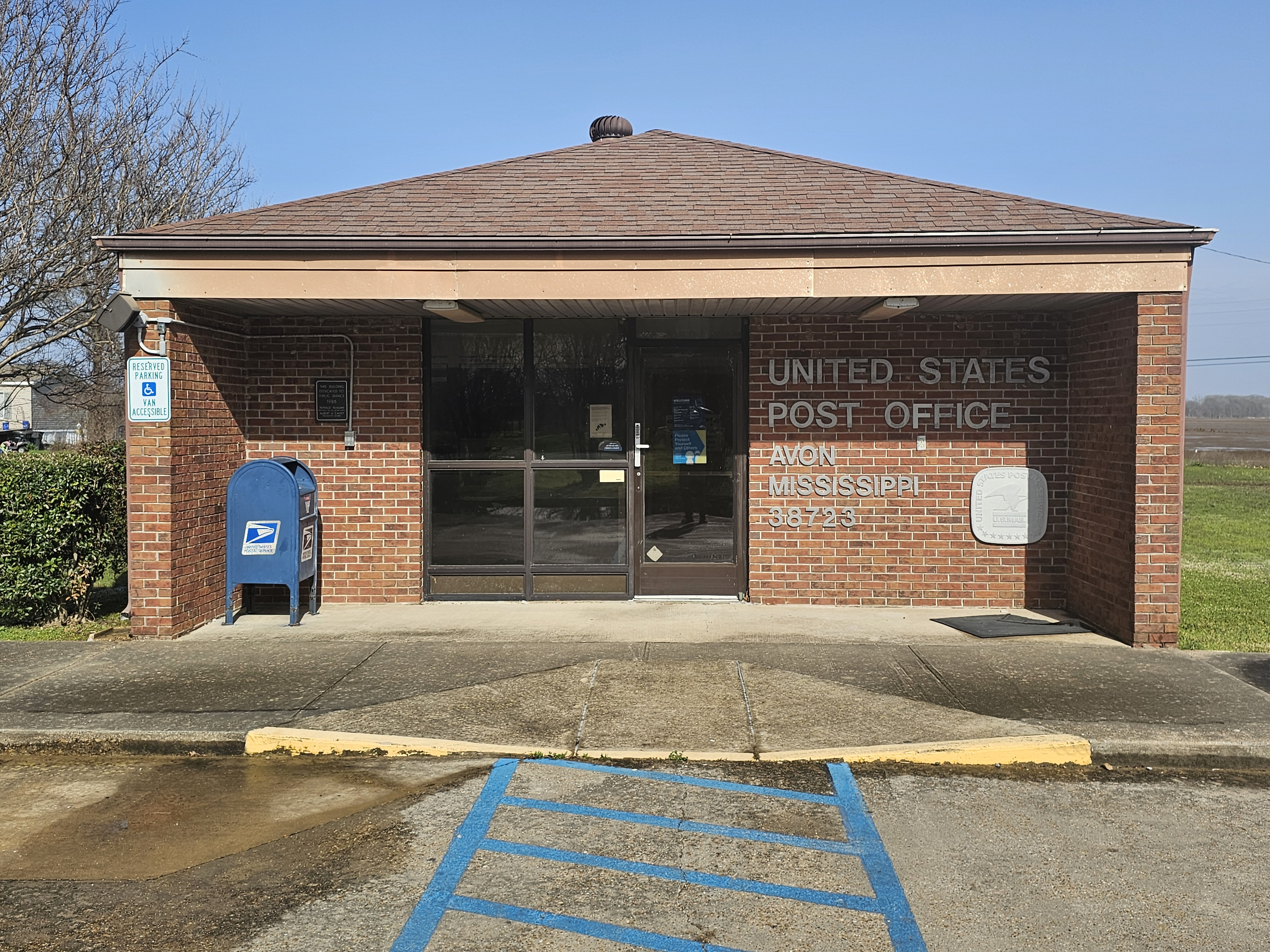
Avon post office
