= Hollandale School District =

School district in Mississippi

Address
- 101 West Washington Street Hollandale, Mississippi, 38748; United States

District information
- Type: Public
- Grades: PreK–12
- NCES District ID: 2801890

Students and staff
- Students: 534
- Teachers: 43.83 (FTE)
- Staff: 54.0 (FTE)
- Student–teacher ratio: 12.18

Other information
- Website: www.hollandalesd.org

The Hollandale School District is a public school district based in Hollandale, Mississippi (USA).

In addition to Hollandale, the district also serves the town of Arcola.

The superintendent for 2025 is Interim Coca Alexandru.

== Schools ==
- Simmons Junior-Senior High School
- T.R Sander PreK-8 Stem Academy

== Demographics ==
=== 2006–07 school year ===
There were a total of 841 students enrolled in the Hollandale School District during the 2006–2007 school year. The gender makeup of the district was 50% female and 50% male. The racial makeup of the district was 99.17% African American, 0.36% White, and 0.48% Hispanic. All of the district's students were eligible to receive free lunch.

=== Previous school years ===
School Year	Enrollment	Gender Makeup		Racial Makeup				
School Year	Enrollment	Female	Male	Asian	African American	Hispanic	Native American	White
2005-06	902	50%	50%	–	99.11%	0.22%	–	0.67%
2004-05	927	50%	50%	–	98.49%	0.43%	–	1.08%
2003-04	995	50%	50%	–	98.99%	0.20%	–	0.80%
2002-03	1,022	50%	50%	–	98.53%	–	–	1.47%

== Accountability statistics ==
	2006–07	2005–06	2004–05	2003–04	2002–03
District Accreditation Status	Accredited	Advised	Accredited	Accredited	Accredited
School Performance Classifications
Level 5 (Superior Performing) Schools	0	0	0	0	0
Level 4 (Exemplary) Schools	0	0	0	1	0
Level 3 (Successful) Schools	3	3	3	2	2
Level 2 (Under Performing) Schools	0	0	0	0	0
Level 1 (Low Performing) Schools	0	0	0	0	0
Not Assigned	0	0	0	0	1

== See also ==
- List of school districts in Mississippi
