= Gilbert Horton (politician) =

American politician

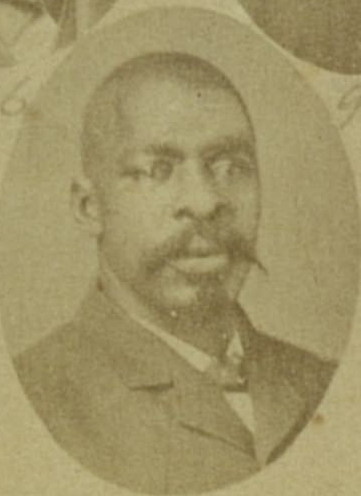
Photograph of Horton

Gilbert Horton (c.1840 - July 1894) was an American politician who served as a justice of the peace and a state legislator in Mississippi. A Republican, he served in the Mississippi House of Representatives in 1884 and 1885.

Horton lived in Greenville, Mississippi with his wife Matilda.

The 1894 Republican Party convention in Vicksburg commemorated him upon announcement of his death.

== See also ==
- African American officeholders from the end of the Civil War until before 1900
