= Stoneville, Mississippi =

- Census-designated place
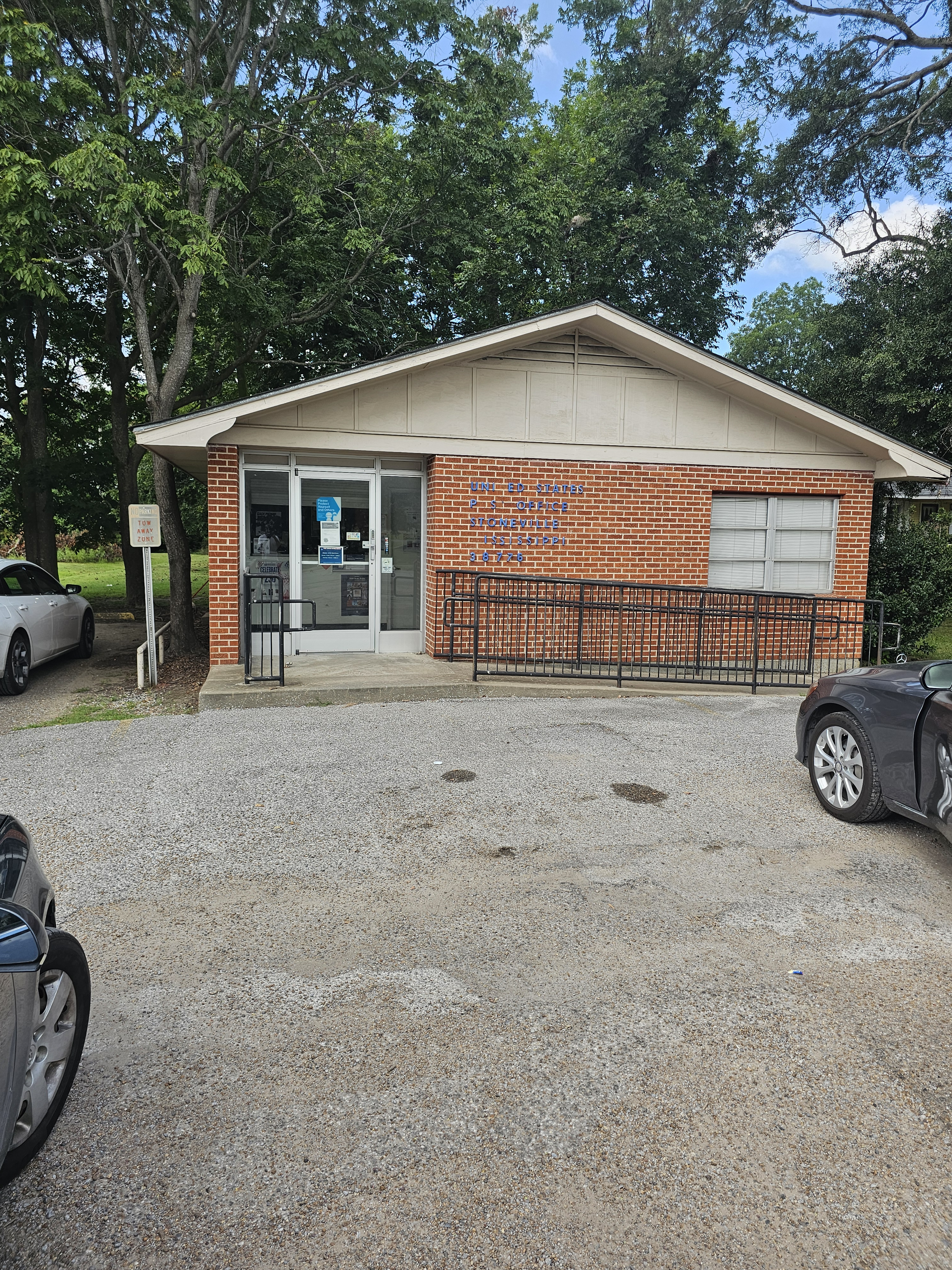
- Stoneville Post Office

- Location within Mississippi Location within the United States
- Coordinates: 33°25′26″N 90°55′18″W
- Country: United States
- State: Mississippi
- County: Washington

Area
  - Total: 1.91 sq mi (4.95 km^{2})
  - Land: 1.91 sq mi (4.95 km^{2})
  - Water: 0 sq mi (0.00 km^{2})
- Elevation: 125 ft (38 m)

Population (2020)
  - Total: 39
  - Density: 20.4/sq mi (7.89/km^{2})
- Time zone: UTC-6 (Central (CST))
  - Summer (DST): UTC-5 (CDT)
- ZIP code: 38776
- GNIS feature ID: 2812752

Stoneville is a census-designated place (CDP) and unincorporated community located in northeastern Washington County, Mississippi. Deer Creek flows through Stoneville.

A post office was established in 1876, and remains open. Stoneville was incorporated in 1882, though it is no longer incorporated.

Stoneville was a train station on the Yazoo and Mississippi Valley Railroad, established in the 1880s, and a stop on the Columbus and Greenville Railway, established in the 1920s.

The Jamie Whitten Delta States Research Center is located in Stoneville. George B. Vogt was a notable entomologist there.

In the 2020 census, the population was listed as 39.

== Demographics ==
Historical population
Census	Pop.	Note	%±
2020	39		—
U.S. Decennial Census; 2020

Stoneville was first listed as a census designated place in the 2020 U.S. census.

=== 2020 census ===
Stoneville CDP, Mississippi – Racial and ethnic composition Note: the US Census treats Hispanic/Latino as an ethnic category. This table excludes Latinos from the racial categories and assigns them to a separate category. Hispanics/Latinos may be of any race.
Race / Ethnicity (NH = Non-Hispanic)	Pop 2020	% 2020
White alone (NH)	23	58.97%
Black or African American alone (NH)	13	33.33%
Native American or Alaska Native alone (NH)	0	0.00%
Asian alone (NH)	0	0.00%
Pacific Islander alone (NH)	0	0.00%
Some Other Race alone (NH)	0	0.00%
Mixed Race or Multi-Racial (NH)	1	2.56%
Hispanic or Latino (any race)	2	5.13%
Total	39	100.00%

== Notable people ==
- Jim Henson, puppeteer, creator of The Muppets; raised in Stoneville but attended elementary school in Leland.
- Johnny "Big Moose" Walker, blues musician.
