= Washington County, Mississippi =

County in Mississippi, United States

- County
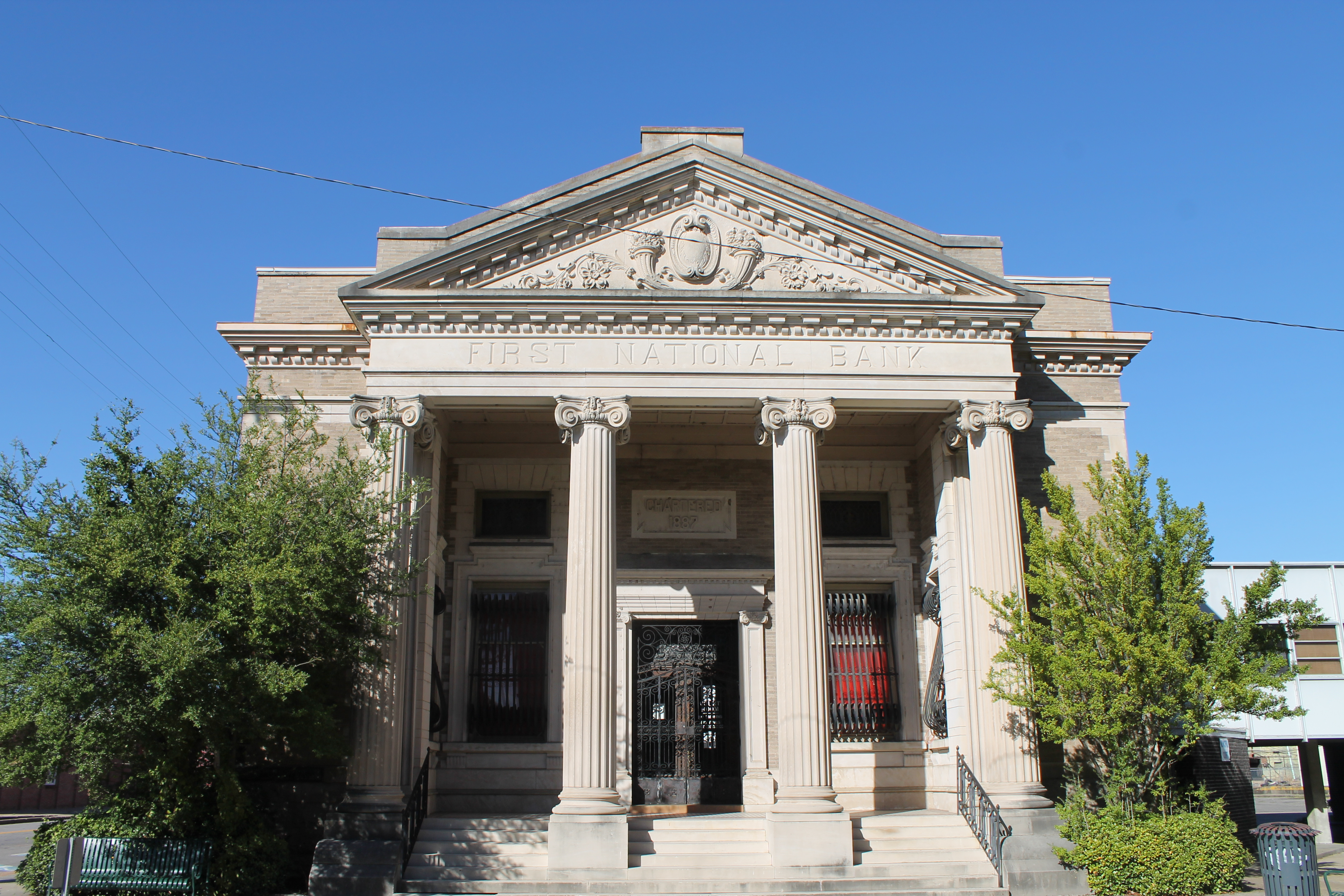
- First National Bank of Greenville

- Location within the U.S. state of Mississippi
- Coordinates: 33°17′N 90°57′W
- Country: United States
- State: Mississippi
- Founded: 1827
- Named for: George Washington
- Seat: Greenville
- Largest city: Greenville

Area
  - Total: 761 sq mi (1,970 km^{2})
  - Land: 725 sq mi (1,880 km^{2})
  - Water: 36 sq mi (93 km^{2}) 4.8%

Population (2020)
  - Total: 44,922
  - Estimate (2025): 40,446 ▼
  - Density: 62.0/sq mi (23.9/km^{2})
- Time zone: UTC−6 (Central)
  - Summer (DST): UTC−5 (CDT)
- Congressional district: 2nd
- Website: www.washingtoncounty.ms

Washington County is a county located in the U.S. state of Mississippi. As of the 2020 census, the population was 44,922. Its county seat is Greenville. The county is named in honor of the first president of the United States, George Washington. It is located next to the Arkansas border. The Greenville, MS Micropolitan Statistical Area includes all of Washington County. It is located in the Mississippi Delta.

== History ==
Located in the Mississippi Delta, Washington County was first developed for cotton cultivation in the antebellum years. Most plantations were developed to have access to the rivers, which were the major transportation routes. Cotton was based on slave labor.

In an 1860 Census, Washington County had an enslaved population of 92.3%, the second-highest anywhere in the country, only behind Issaquena County, Mississippi (92.5%). In the period from 1877 to 1950, Washington County had 12 documented lynchings of African Americans. Most occurred around the turn of the 20th century, as part of white imposition of Jim Crow conditions and suppression of black voting.

== Geography ==
According to the U.S. Census Bureau, the county has a total area of 761 square miles (1,970 km^{2}), of which 725 square miles (1,880 km^{2}) is land and 36 square miles (93 km^{2}) (4.8%) is water.

=== Adjacent counties ===
- Bolivar County (north)
- Sunflower County (northeast)
- Humphreys County (east)
- Sharkey County (southeast)
- Issaquena County (south)
- Chicot County, Arkansas (west)
- Desha County, Arkansas (northwest)

=== National protected areas ===
- Holt Collier National Wildlife Refuge
- Theodore Roosevelt National Wildlife Refuge (part)
- Yazoo National Wildlife Refuge

== Demographics ==
Historical population
Census	Pop.	Note	%±
1830	1,976		—
1840	7,287		268.8%
1850	8,389		15.1%
1860	15,679		86.9%
1870	14,569		−7.1%
1880	25,367		74.1%
1890	40,414		59.3%
1900	49,216		21.8%
1910	48,933		−0.6%
1920	51,092		4.4%
1930	54,310		6.3%
1940	67,576		24.4%
1950	70,504		4.3%
1960	78,638		11.5%
1970	70,581		−10.2%
1980	72,344		2.5%
1990	67,935		−6.1%
2000	62,977		−7.3%
2010	51,137		−18.8%
2020	44,922		−12.2%
2025 (est.)	40,446	▼	−10.0%
U.S. Decennial Census; 1790-1960 1900-1990; 1990-2000 2010-2013

=== Racial and ethnic composition ===
Washington County, Mississippi – Racial and ethnic composition Note: the US Census treats Hispanic/Latino as an ethnic category. This table excludes Latinos from the racial categories and assigns them to a separate category. Hispanics/Latinos may be of any race.
Race / Ethnicity (NH = Non-Hispanic)	Pop 1980	Pop 1990	Pop 2000	Pop 2010	Pop 2020	% 1980	% 1990	% 2000	% 2010	% 2020
White alone (NH)	31,381	28,174	21,243	13,654	11,180	43.38%	41.47%	33.73%	26.70%	24.89%
Black or African American alone (NH)	39,789	39,035	40,495	36,348	31,919	55.00%	57.46%	64.30%	71.08%	71.05%
Native American or Alaska Native alone (NH)	21	53	54	56	48	0.03%	0.08%	0.09%	0.11%	0.11%
Asian alone (NH)	368	244	327	291	302	0.51%	0.36%	0.52%	0.57%	0.67%
Native Hawaiian or Pacific Islander alone (NH)	x	x	9	6	5	x	x	0.01%	0.01%	0.01%
Other race alone (NH)	66	13	16	13	69	0.09%	0.02%	0.03%	0.03%	0.15%
Mixed race or Multiracial (NH)	x	x	302	240	815	x	x	0.48%	100%	1.81%
Hispanic or Latino (any race)	719	416	531	529	584	0.99%	0.61%	0.84%	1.03%	1.30%
Total	72,344	67,935	62,977	51,137	44,922	100.00%	100.00%	100.00%	100.00%	100.00%

=== 2020 census ===
As of the 2020 census, the county had a population of 44,922. The median age was 40.6 years. 23.7% of residents were under the age of 18 and 18.0% of residents were 65 years of age or older. For every 100 females there were 86.1 males, and for every 100 females age 18 and over there were 82.1 males age 18 and over.

The racial makeup of the county was 25.1% White, 71.3% Black or African American, 0.1% American Indian and Alaska Native, 0.7% Asian, <0.1% Native Hawaiian and Pacific Islander, 0.7% from some other race, and 2.0% from two or more races. Hispanic or Latino residents of any race comprised 1.3% of the population.

65.2% of residents lived in urban areas, while 34.8% lived in rural areas.

There were 17,954 households in the county, of which 30.8% had children under the age of 18 living in them. Of all households, 29.7% were married-couple households, 20.4% were households with a male householder and no spouse or partner present, and 42.7% were households with a female householder and no spouse or partner present. About 32.8% of all households were made up of individuals and 14.0% had someone living alone who was 65 years of age or older.

There were 20,879 housing units, of which 14.0% were vacant. Among occupied housing units, 55.1% were owner-occupied and 44.9% were renter-occupied. The homeowner vacancy rate was 1.7% and the rental vacancy rate was 15.0%.

=== 2010 census ===
As of the 2010 United States census, there were 51,137 people living in the county. 71.3% were Black or African American, 27.0% White, 0.6% Asian, 0.1% Native American, 0.4% of some other race and 0.6% of two or more races. 1.0% were Hispanic or Latino (of any race).

=== 2000 census ===
As of the census of 2000, there were 62,977 people, 22,158 households, and 15,931 families living in the county. The population density was 87 people per square mile (34 people/km^{2}). There were 24,381 housing units at an average density of 34 units per square mile (13 units/km^{2}). The racial makeup of the county was 69.57% Black or African American, 33.97% White, 0.09% Native American, 0.53% Asian, 0.02% Pacific Islander, 0.25% from other races, and 0.57% from two or more races. 0.84% of the population were Hispanic or Latino of any race.

According to the census of 2000, the largest ancestry groups in Washington County were African 69.57%, English 21.4%, Scottish 8.2% and Scots-Irish 3.1%

Washington County by 2005 was 67.2% African-American in population. Latinos constituted 1.1% of the population in the county while non-Hispanic whites made up 31.7% of the population.

As of the census of 2000, there were 22,158 households, out of which 36.30% had children under the age of 18 living with them, 40.60% were married couples living together, 26.00% had a female householder with no husband present, and 28.10% were non-families. 24.60% of all households were made up of individuals, and 10.00% had someone living alone who was 65 years of age or older. The average household size was 2.80 and the average family size was 3.35.

In the county, the population was spread out, with 31.50% under the age of 18, 10.10% from 18 to 24, 26.50% from 25 to 44, 20.50% from 45 to 64, and 11.50% who were 65 years of age or older. The median age was 32 years. For every 100 females there were 87.70 males. For every 100 females age 18 and over, there were 80.30 males.

The median income for a household in the county was $25,757, and the median income for a family was $30,324. Males had a median income of $28,266 versus $20,223 for females. The per capita income for the county was $13,430. About 24.90% of families and 29.20% of the population were below the poverty line, including 38.40% of those under age 18 and 24.60% of those age 65 or over.

Washington County's demographics are rooted in the region's mid-nineteenth-century ascendance in cotton production and, accordingly, importation of people as slaves. According to the historian Sven Beckert, the county had "more than ten slaves for every white inhabitant" in 1840, and "every white family in the county held on average more than eighty slaves" by 1850.

=== 1990 census ===
As of the census of 1990, there were 67,935 people living in the county. The racial makeup of the county was 57.46% (39,035) Black or African American, 41.47% (28,174) White, 0.08% (53) Native American, 0.36% (244) Asian, and 0.02% (13) from other races. 0.61% (416) were Hispanic or Latino of any race.

== Transportation ==
=== Major highways ===
- U.S. Highway 82
- U.S. Highway 61
- U.S. Highway 278
- Mississippi Highway 1
- Mississippi Highway 12

=== Airport ===
Mid Delta Regional Airport, owned by the City of Greenville, is located in an unincorporated area in the county.

== Education ==
- Public School Districts
  - Greenville Public School District
  - Leland School District
  - Hollandale School District
  - Western Line School District
- Private Schools
  - Deer Creek School (Arcola)
  - Greenville Christian School
  - Saint Joseph Catholic High School (Greenville)
  - Washington School (Greenville)

Pillow Academy in unincorporated Leflore County, near Greenwood, enrolls some students from Washington County. It originally was a segregation academy.

== Communities ==
=== Cities ===
- Greenville (third and current county seat)
- Hollandale
- Leland

=== Towns ===
- Arcola
- Metcalfe

=== Census-designated places ===
- Elizabeth
- Glen Allan
- Stoneville
- Winterville

=== Unincorporated communities ===
- Avon
- Burdett
- Chatham
- Darlove
- Erwin
- Foote
- McCutcheon
- Murphy
- Percy
- Refuge
- Tralake
- Tribbett
- Wayside
- Wilmot

=== Ghost towns ===
- New Mexico (first county seat)
- Port Anderson
- Princeton (second county seat)

== Politics ==
Washington County has a very high African American population and is a Democratic stronghold, having been so for decades. The last Republican to carry the county was George H. W. Bush, who won it by 7 votes in 1988.

United States presidential election results for Washington County, Mississippi
Year	Republican		Democratic		Third party(ies)	
Year	No.	%	No.	%	No.	%
1912	20	2.42%	731	88.39%	76	9.19%
1916	47	5.30%	836	94.36%	3	0.34%
1920	60	7.17%	776	92.71%	1	0.12%
1924	143	10.06%	1,277	89.80%	2	0.14%
1928	246	14.12%	1,496	85.88%	0	0.00%
1932	100	5.57%	1,691	94.21%	4	0.22%
1936	94	4.19%	2,143	95.63%	4	0.18%
1940	292	11.05%	2,349	88.91%	1	0.04%
1944	454	18.41%	2,012	81.59%	0	0.00%
1948	271	9.10%	260	8.73%	2,448	82.18%
1952	3,301	55.77%	2,618	44.23%	0	0.00%
1956	1,973	35.94%	2,722	49.58%	795	14.48%
1960	2,292	34.44%	3,105	46.66%	1,258	18.90%
1964	5,611	73.68%	2,004	26.32%	0	0.00%
1968	3,500	22.85%	5,520	36.03%	6,300	41.12%
1972	9,634	63.78%	4,623	30.61%	847	5.61%
1976	7,474	41.18%	9,650	53.17%	1,025	5.65%
1980	8,978	44.63%	10,722	53.30%	417	2.07%
1984	12,454	53.19%	10,617	45.34%	343	1.46%
1988	10,229	49.45%	10,222	49.41%	236	1.14%
1992	7,598	38.59%	10,588	53.78%	1,503	7.63%
1996	6,762	38.77%	10,053	57.64%	625	3.58%
2000	7,367	40.20%	10,405	56.77%	556	3.03%
2004	7,731	39.45%	11,569	59.03%	297	1.52%
2008	6,347	32.41%	13,148	67.14%	88	0.45%
2012	5,651	28.66%	13,981	70.92%	83	0.42%
2016	5,244	31.17%	11,380	67.64%	201	1.19%
2020	5,300	29.43%	12,503	69.43%	205	1.14%
2024	4,649	31.97%	9,735	66.95%	156	1.07%

== See also ==
- National Register of Historic Places listings in Washington County, Mississippi
