= Arcola, Mississippi =

- Town
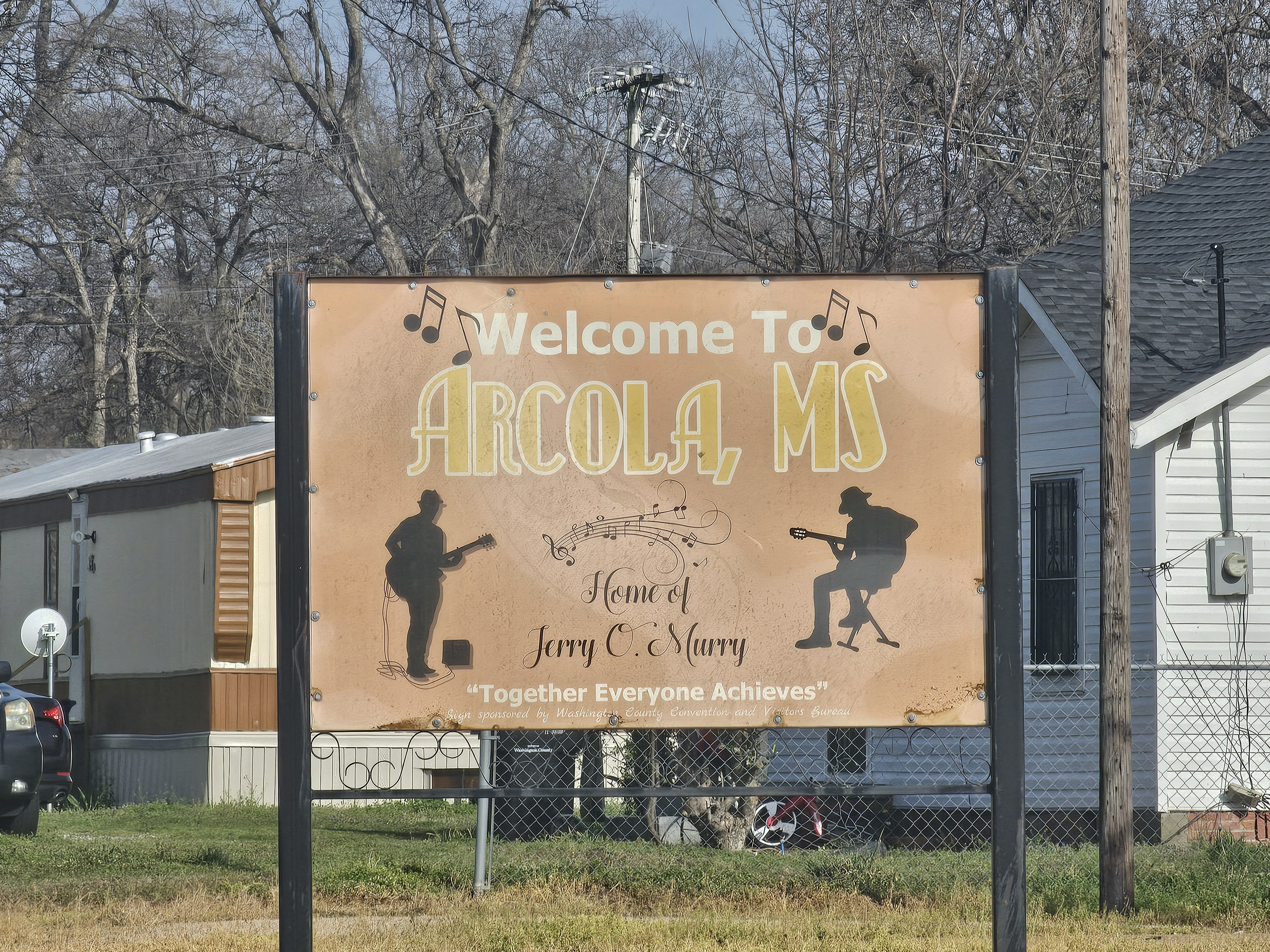
- Welcome Sign in Arcola
- Motto: "A Town United Today"
- Location of Arcola, Mississippi

- Location in the United States
- Coordinates: 33°16′14″N 90°52′48″W
- Country: United States
- State: Mississippi
- County: Washington

Area
  - Total: 0.22 sq mi (0.57 km^{2})
  - Land: 0.22 sq mi (0.57 km^{2})
  - Water: 0 sq mi (0.00 km^{2})
- Elevation: 118 ft (36 m)

Population (2020)
  - Total: 304
  - Density: 1,385.7/sq mi (535.04/km^{2})
- Time zone: UTC-6 (Central (CST))
  - Summer (DST): UTC-5 (CDT)
- ZIP code: 38722
- Area code: 662
- FIPS code: 28-01820
- GNIS feature ID: 2405162

Arcola is a town in Washington County, Mississippi. The population was 304 at the 2020 census, down from 361 at the 2010 census.

== History ==
According to linguist Keith Baca, the name Arcola may be derived from the Choctaw language meaning "jar".

In the 1900s, Leroy Percy owned the Trail Lake Plantation, a Southern plantation near Arcola.

In his 2015 travel book entitled Deep South: Four Seasons on Back Roads, author Paul Theroux describes it as a "ghost town."

== Geography ==
According to the United States Census Bureau, the town has a total area of 0.2 square miles (0.52 km^{2}), all land.

== Demographics ==
Historical population
Census	Pop.	Note	%±
1910	512		—
1920	453		−11.5%
1930	343		−24.3%
1940	444		29.4%
1950	413		−7.0%
1960	366		−11.4%
1970	517		41.3%
1980	588		13.7%
1990	564		−4.1%
2000	563		−0.2%
2010	361		−35.9%
2020	304		−15.8%
U.S. Decennial Census

=== Racial and ethnic composition ===
Arcola town, Mississippi – Racial and ethnic composition Note: the US Census treats Hispanic/Latino as an ethnic category. This table excludes Latinos from the racial categories and assigns them to a separate category. Hispanics/Latinos may be of any race.
Race / Ethnicity (NH = Non-Hispanic)	Pop 2000	Pop 2010	Pop 2020	% 2000	% 2010	% 2020
White alone (NH)	27	23	35	4.80%	6.37%	11.51%
Black or African American alone (NH)	534	333	264	94.85%	92.24%	86.84%
Native American or Alaska Native alone (NH)	0	0	0	0.00%	0.00%	0.00%
Asian alone (NH)	0	0	1	0.00%	0.00%	0.33%
Native Hawaiian or Pacific Islander alone (NH)	0	0	0	0.00%	0.00%	0.00%
Other race alone (NH)	0	0	0	0.00%	0.00%	0.00%
Mixed race or Multiracial (NH)	1	2	3	0.18%	0.55%	0.99%
Hispanic or Latino (any race)	1	3	1	0.18%	0.83%	0.33%
Total	563	361	304	100.00%	100.00%	100.00%

=== 2020 census ===
As of the 2020 United States census, there were 304 people, 95 households, and 65 families residing in the town.

=== 2000 census ===
As of the census of 2000, there were 563 people, 183 households, and 122 families residing in the town. The population density was 2,515.2 inhabitants per square mile (971.1/km^{2}). There were 220 housing units at an average density of 982.9 per square mile (379.5/km^{2}). The racial makeup of the town was 95.03% African American, 4.80% White and 0.18% from two or more races. Hispanic or Latino of any race were 0.18% of the population.

There were 183 households, out of which 36.6% had children under the age of 18 living with them, 23.0% were married couples living together, 36.1% had a female householder with no husband present, and 33.3% were non-families. 27.9% of all households were made up of individuals, and 13.7% had someone living alone who was 65 years of age or older. The average household size was 3.08 and the average family size was 3.83.

In the town, the population was spread out, with 36.6% under the age of 18, 10.3% from 18 to 24, 25.8% from 25 to 44, 18.5% from 45 to 64, and 8.9% who were 65 years of age or older. The median age was 28 years. For every 100 females, there were 77.6 males. For every 100 females age 18 and over, there were 71.6 males.

The median income for a household in the town was $18,409, and the median income for a family was $18,594. Males had a median income of $22,321 versus $13,466 for females. The per capita income for the town was $6,827. About 43.4% of families and 49.7% of the population were below the poverty line, including 63.2% of those under age 18 and 53.2% of those age 65 or over.

== Education ==
The Town of Arcola is served by the Hollandale School District. It is also home to the Deer Creek Academy, an independent private school founded in the 1970s.
