= Mark A Tullos Jr. =

American museum director (born 1961)

- Born: January 19, 1961 (age 65); Baton Rouge, LA
- Known for: Director

Mark A Tullos Jr. (born January 19, 1961, in Baton Rouge, Louisiana) is an American museum director, who is the Director of the LSU Museum of Art in Baton Rouge, Louisiana He was formerly the founding President and CEO of the Mississippi Arts and Entertainment Experience in Meridian, Mississippi. He has been the Assistant Secretary for the Louisiana Office of State Museum, Director of the Louisiana State Museum in New Orleans, Louisiana.

== Education ==
Tullos received a degree in visual arts from Louisiana State University. He attended graduate school at Stephen F. Austin University and also participated in Getty Leadership Institute at Claremont Graduate University. Tullos served as a member of the advisory board for the Museum Loan Network at Massachusetts Institute of Technology, the honors committee of the American Alliance of Museums (AAM), a panelist for the National Museum Service Board, and a peer reviewer for AAM, Institute of Museum and Library Services, and the state arts commissions of Louisiana, Mississippi, Texas and Florida.

== Early career ==
Tullos was also executive director for the Paul and Lulu Hilliard University Art Museum at the University of Louisiana at Lafayette from 2004 to 2012. Previously, he held director posts at the Armory Art Center, West Palm Beach, Florida; the Alexandria Museum of Art, Alexandria, Louisiana; Walter Anderson Museum of Art, Ocean Springs, Mississippi and the Museum of East Texas, Lufkin. In 1995, he was the recipient of the Nancy Hanks Memorial Award for Professional Excellence given by the American Alliance of Museums, Washington, D.C.

== Museums and expansion projects ==
In 1986, Tullos initiated a 1.2 million dollar campaign to expand the Museum of East Texas. The Museum opened in 1989. Tullos was the founding director of the Walter Anderson Museum of Art and oversaw the construction and opening of the museum which opened in 1992. The Alexandria Museum of Art hired Tullos to oversee the capital campaign and expansion of the Alexandria Museum of Art. The seven million dollar addition and renovated historic Rapides Bank and Trust Company Building opened in 1998. In 2016, Tullos moved to Meridian, Mississippi, to lead in the negotiation of state bond issues related to funding the creation of the Mississippi Arts and Entertainment Experience. The 50,000 sq. ft. museum opened in April 2018.

=== Forgery incident ===
In 2010, Tullos played a role in exposing art forger, Mark A. Landis. The next year Tullos organized an exhibition exploring provenance research and art forgery. The exhibition was nominated for the Annette Giacometti Prize, recognizing exhibitions that raise public awareness about the problem of fakes and forgeries. In 2014, a documentary film titled Art and Craft featured Tullos and others involved in the exposure of Landis.

== Selected publications and articles ==
- Historians Sift the Ruins for Ferguson’s Legacy, Mitch Smith, The New York Times, January 30, 2015
- Second Life, Country Roads Magazine, Jan Risher, May 2015
- "Jesuit Priest" Donates Fraudulent Work, Helen Stoilis, The Art Newspaper, p. 1, 4.
- On the Bayou: Hunt Slonem, University of Louisiana at Lafayette, LA, Paul and Lulu Hilliard University Art Museum, Jan. 2010
- East/West: Visually Speaking, University of Louisiana at Lafayette, LA, Paul and Lulu Hilliard University Art Museum, Oct. 2009, p. 4
- Dodge a Bullet: Margaret Evangeline, University of Louisiana at Lafayette, LA, Jan 2006
- 'Vision 2010' University Art Museum Sets Course, La Louisiane Magazine, October, 2010
- Opening a Dialogue with The Town Talk, Museum Loan Network, Cambridge, MA, Summer 1999, p. 8
- Salvation on Sand Mountain: Photographs by Jim Neel and Melissa Springer, Alexandria Museum of Art, (Jan. 1996), pp. 7–9.
- Walter Inglis Anderson Birds, Arts Quarterly, New Orleans Museum of Art, Volume XIV, Issue 3, 1992, 8 – 9.
- 20 Questions with Mark Tullos, Susan Bosco, Coast Magazine, April/May 1991, p. 29-31
