= Hilliard Art Museum =

Museum in Lafayette, Louisiana

Coordinates: 30°12′33″N 92°00′57″W

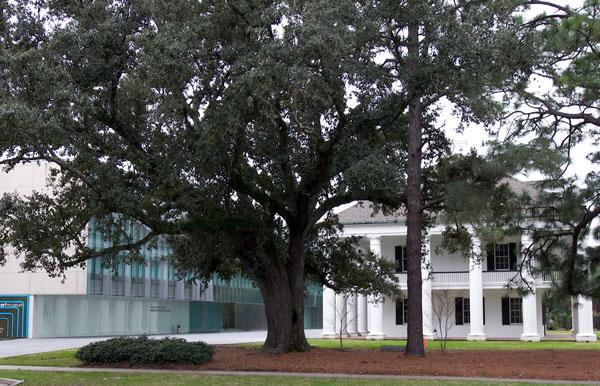
- Established: 1964
- Location: 710 East St. Mary Blvd. Lafayette, Louisiana, USA
- Type: Art museum
- Architect: Eskew+Dumez+Ripple
- Website: hilliardartmuseum.org

The Hilliard Art Museum (formerly the Paul and Lulu Hilliard University Art Museum) is the art museum of the University of Louisiana at Lafayette, located in Lafayette, Louisiana. It was named after Paul and Lulu Hilliard, following a US$5 million donation for the museum building's construction in 2002.

== History ==
In 1964, Lafayette businessman and philanthropist, Maurice Heymann donated to the University of Southwestern Louisiana (USL), now University of Louisiana at Lafayette, three-acres of land located on the corner of East Saint Mary Boulevard and Girard Park Drive for the purpose of building the Art Center for Southwestern Louisiana.

=== Town building ===
In 1965, USL Foundation began planning for the construction and operation of the center. Starting with a fund of $100,000, the Foundation began a campaign to secure an additional $400,000. Construction on the center began in April 1967 and the building opened to the public in March 1968. The center, a replica of the Hermitage (Darrow, Louisiana), a 19th-century Louisiana River Road Greek Revival plantation house, was designed by A. Hays Town. Bricks from the demolished first Martin Hall ("Old Martin Hall"), the school's administrative offices, were used in the construction of the Town Building, following the construction of the current Martin Hall ("New Martin Hall). Also, and as specified by Town, red dust from the bricks was mixed into the white paint, initially giving the building a slightly rosy tint. This was in place for many years, however subsequent paintings have removed this feature, and the building is now exclusively white in color.

=== University art museum ===
In 2002, Lafayette residents Paul and Lulu Hilliard, presented UL Lafayette Foundation a lead gift of $5 million for the construction of a new $8.5 million university art museum, the vision of Herman Mhire, the museum's founder. The new Paul and Lulu Hilliard University Art Museum opened in April 2004. The museum building is 33,000 square feet (3,100 m^{2}) with over 11,000 square feet (1,000 m^{2}) of gallery space. Its design is the result of a collaboration between museum founder, Herman Mhire, and Eskew+Dumez+Ripple, a New Orleans–based studio.

=== Forgery incident ===
In September 2010, Mark Landis went to the Paul and Lulu Hilliard University Art Museum, under the identity of a jesuit priest, Father Arthur Scott. He donated a painting said to be by Charles Courtney Curran, under the pretext of the loss of his mother. The director asked the museum registrar to verify the painting. After examining the painting under blacklight, the colors glowed suspiciously. A microscope observation then showed a dot-matrix pattern, hinting that a mere photocopy of the original had been projected on the board and then painted over. In November 2010, The Art Newspaper published a complete paper on the matter. The last known attempt by Landis took place in November 2010, again under the Father Arthur Scott identity, at the Ackland Art Museum, with a French academy drawing.

Matthew Leininger and Aaron Cowan set up an exhibition wishing to address the general matter of forgery in art, and specifically Landis' works. The curators collected some 90 pieces by Landis, who provided his "jesuit father" costume and some of his art books. Named "Faux Real", it took place from April first to May 20, 2012, at the Dorothy W. and C. Lawson Reed Jr. Gallery, Cincinnati. The organizers set up a short video featuring Landis' most relevant paintings.

== Exhibition program ==
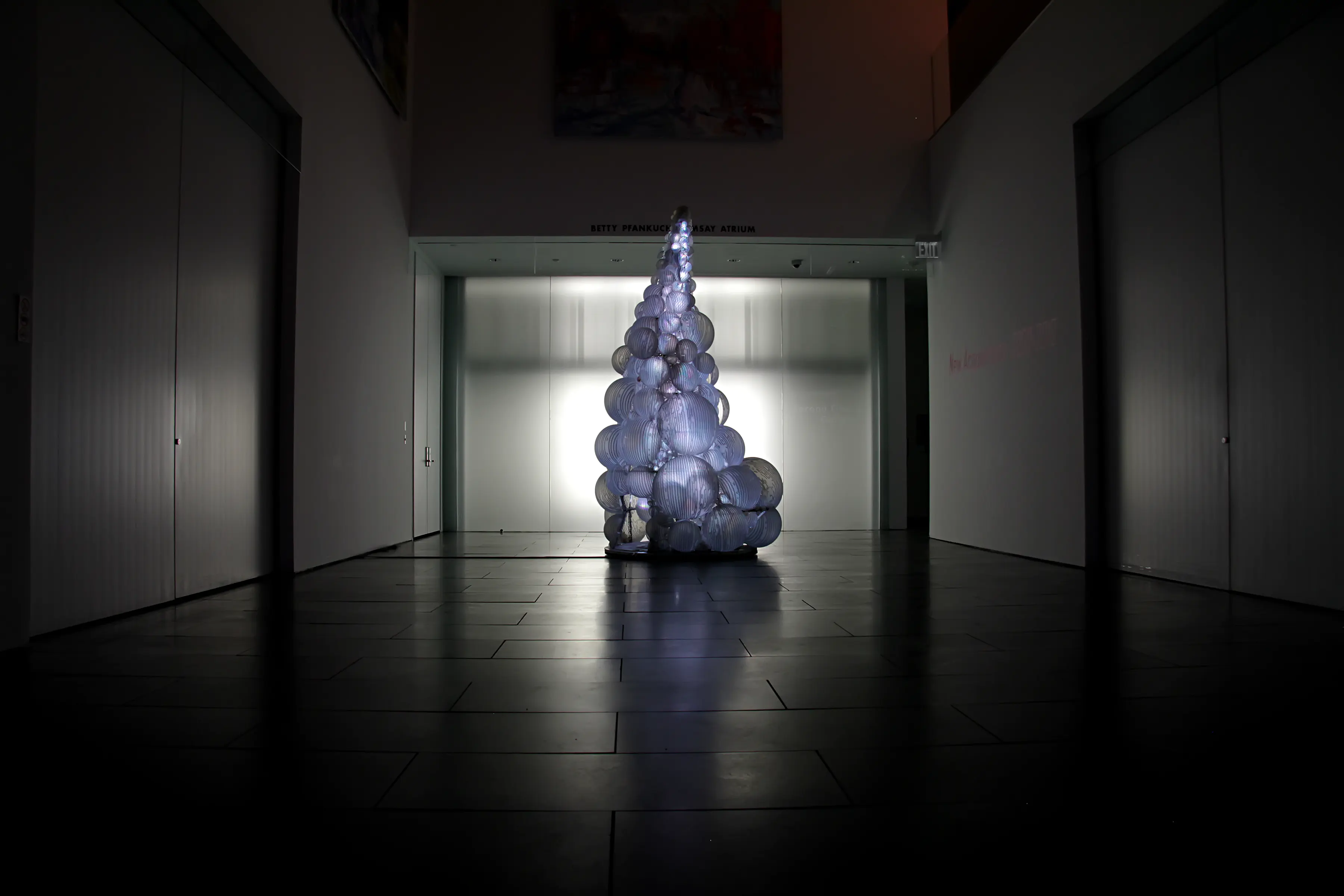
A light sculpture installation, Uros House, by Grimanesa Amorós, in front of the Betty Pfankuch Ramsay Atrium.

The museum has over 9,000 square feet of exhibition space and three main galleries with rotating exhibits and collection displays that change each semester.

== Collection ==
The Paul and Lulu Hilliard University Art Museum collection includes over 2,000 objects from the 18th, 19th, 20th, and 21st centuries. It features American, European and Asian art works in all media, as well as objects from Africa. The collection particularly focuses on artists active in Louisiana and/or those who have influenced the culture of Louisiana.

=== Henry Botkin Collection ===
The museum holds 150 pieces from American Modernist Henry Botkin in oil, pastel, and collage produced from the 1930s to the 1960s. It is considered one of the most important single collections held at the Hilliard.

=== Jacqueline Heymann Cohn Japanese Print Collection ===
A collection of Japanese woodblock printing, illustrating the changes in Japanese society from the late 19th to the early 20th century. The subjects vary from popular social interests and concerns, to beautiful women, to handsome actors, and political satire.

=== Sylvia and Warren Lowe Collection of American Vernacular Art ===
A collection of folk art, also called self-taught or vernacular art. Artists include Gertrude Morgan, James Thomas, Ida Rittenberg Kohlmeyer, Sulton Rogers, Henry Ray Clark, Welmon Sharlhorne and many artists active along the Gulf Coast.

=== Louisiana Collection ===
19th–21st century paintings, drawings, prints, photographs, and sculpture by artists with Louisiana and regional heritage. Artists include Clementine Hunter, John McCrady, Robert Rauschenberg, William Moreland, Elemore Morgan, Jr., George Rodrigue, Hunt Slonem, Fred Daspit, Margaret Evangeline, Cora Kelley Ward, Clyde Connell, among many others.

=== Ambassador Jefferson Caffery Collection ===
A collection of ancient Egyptian art that Jefferson Caffery gathered while he was the U.S. ambassador to Egypt (1949–1955).

=== European and American Painting Collection ===
A growing collection establish through the generous contributions of W. E. Groves and the ongoing contributions of Robert and Jolie Shelton, George and Betty Jo Newton, and Elizabeth Dubus Baldridge. Also includes Andy Warhol.
