= Leland High School =

Leland High School can refer to more than one educational institution in the United States:

- Leland High School (San Jose, California)
- Leland High School (Leland, Illinois)
- Leland High School (Leland, Mississippi)

== See also ==
- Lealands High School
- Leland School District
