= Leland Sundries =

American band

Leland Sundries is an American five-piece band based in Brooklyn, New York, United States, led by singer-songwriter Nick Loss-Eaton. The other members of the band are Matthew Sklar, Ivan DeYoung-Dominguez, Gregg Tallent and Curtis Brewer. Critics have described their music as influenced by multiple genres, including Americana, country music, and roots music. The band got the idea for their name when they saw a sign in Memphis, Tennessee that said "sundries" on it, and then went to see blues guitarist Eddie Cusic in Leland, Mississippi. They released their debut album, Music for Outcasts, on L'Echiquier Records in 2016. Loss-Eaton explained that he chose the album's title because it accurately sums up the characters in the album's songs, telling Magnet, “I feel like all these characters are trying to get to someplace, but they’re kind of lost."

== Critical reception ==
Scott Zuppardo wrote that Music for Outcasts owed "as much to Dead Boys as The Smiths and as much [to] Rolling Stones as Tom Petty." In a favorable review, Peter Chianca wrote that the album had "a cutting sense of humor and a literary array of flesh-and-blood characters, many of them women, whom you’ll miss when they’re gone."

== Discography ==
=== EPs ===
- The Apothecary (2010, L'echiquier Records)
- The Foundry (2012, L'echiquier Records)

=== Albums ===
- Music For Outcasts (2016, L'echiquier Records)
