= Trivigno (surname) =

Trivigno is a surname. Notable people with the surname include:

- Bobby Trivigno (born 1999), American ice hockey player
- Dana Trivigno (born 1994), American ice hockey player
- Pat Trivigno (1922–2013), American artist and professor
