= Arts and crafts (disambiguation) =

Arts and crafts or handicrafts are activities related to making things with one's own hands and skill, or examples of the output of such activity.

Arts and crafts may also refer to:

- Arts and Crafts movement, an artistic and design movement originating in late 19th-century Europe
- Arts & Crafts Productions, an independent music publisher in Toronto, Ontario, Canada
  - Arts & Crafts México, its Mexican subsidiary
- "Arts and Crafts", a song by Red Light Company

== See also ==
- Mark A. Landis, subject of the documentary film Art and Craft (2014)
