= Pat Trivigno =

American painter

- Born: Pasquale Trivigno; March 13, 1922; New York City, U.S.
- Died: January 30, 2013 (aged 90); New Orleans, LA
- Education: Columbia University; Temple University's Tyler School of Art
- Occupations: Painter, educator
- Spouse: Helen Kohl 1947-1985; Eva LaMothe 1986-2013
- Children: One son - Stephen N. Trivigno b.1949 - d.2014; One daughter - Michele Trivigno Runningen b. 1953 - d.2004 Two Granddaughters: Nicole M. Gladden b.1984, and Jacqueline L. Runningen b.1987 - d.2019
- Parent(s): Mother - Agatha Nardi; Father - Canio Trivigno

Pat Trivigno (March 13, 1922 – January 30, 2013) was an American painter and educator. He taught at Tulane University for 43 years. His paintings can be seen at the Brooklyn Museum, New York, the Guggenheim Museum, New York, the Ogden Museum of Southern Art and the New Orleans Museum of Art.

== Life ==
Trivigno was born in 1922 in New York City to Italian immigrants. He graduated from Columbia University and Temple University's Tyler School of Art.

Trivigno taught at Tulane University from 1947 to 1989. As a painter, he was influenced by Cubism and Mexican art, and his artwork was exhibited in the United States and Europe. For example, the Alexandria Museum of Art in Alexandria, Louisiana exhibited 60 paintings by Trivigno in 1995. His artwork was acquired by the Ogden Museum of Southern Art and the New Orleans Museum of Art.

Trivigno married Eva LaMothe. He died on January 30, 2013, at age 90.
