= Antonio Johnson (defensive tackle) =

American football player (born 1984)

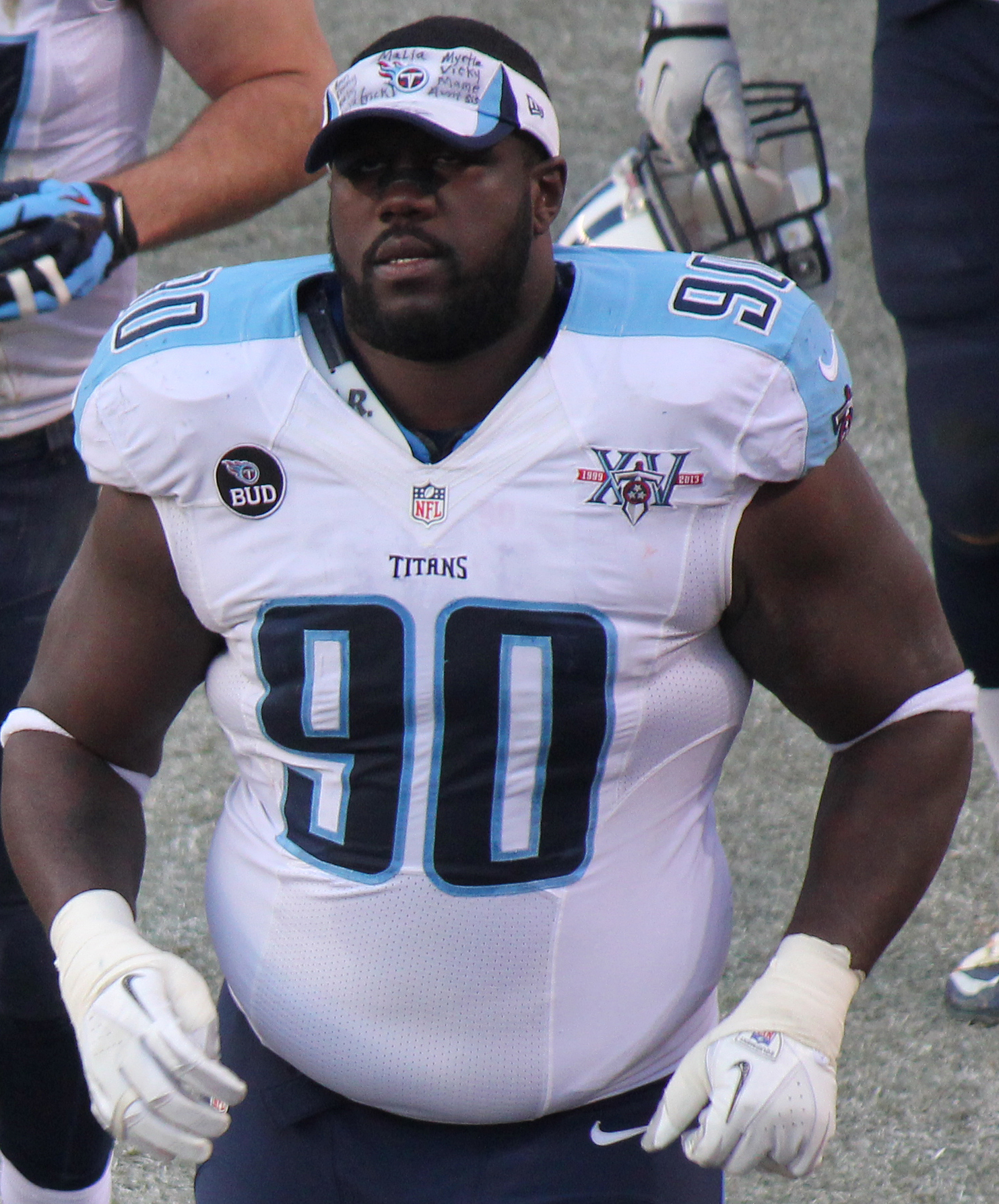
- Johnson with the Titans in 2013

No. 99, 90
- Position: Nose tackle

Personal information
- Born: December 8, 1984 (age 41); Greenville, Mississippi, U.S.
- Listed height: 6 ft 3 in (1.91 m)
- Listed weight: 328 lb (149 kg)

Career information
- High school: Leland (MS)
- College: Mississippi State
- NFL draft: 2007: 5th round, 152nd overall pick

Career history
- Tennessee Titans (2007–2008); Indianapolis Colts (2008–2012); Tennessee Titans (2013); New England Patriots (2015)*
- * Offseason or practice squad member only

Career NFL statistics
- Total tackles: 142
- Sacks: 4.5
- Forced fumbles: 1
- Fumble recoveries: 1
- Pass deflections: 3
- Stats at Pro Football Reference

Antonio Rico Johnson (born December 8, 1984) is an American former professional football player who was a nose tackle in the National Football League (NFL). He played college football for the Mississippi State Bulldogs and was selected by the Tennessee Titans in the fifth round of the 2007 NFL draft. He also played for the Indianapolis Colts.

== College career ==
He played defensive tackle at Mississippi Delta Community College for two years earning honorable mention All-America honors before transferring to Mississippi State University to play from 2003 to 2006.

== Professional career ==
Pre-draft measurables
Height	Weight	Arm length	Hand span	40-yard dash	10-yard split	20-yard split	20-yard shuttle	Three-cone drill	Vertical jump	Broad jump	Bench press
6 ft 3 in (1.91 m)	310 lb (141 kg)	34 3/8 in (0.87 m)	9 1/8 in (0.23 m)	5.08 s	1.72 s	2.91 s	4.49 s	7.47 s	29.0 in (0.74 m)	9 ft 0 in (2.74 m)	28 reps
All values from NFL Combine/Pro Day

=== Tennessee Titans (first stint) ===
The Tennessee Titans selected Johnson in the fifth round as the 152nd overall pick in 2007 NFL draft. He was given the number 96 by the Titans. On August 1, 2007, Johnson tore his ACL while participating in training camp drills and was forced to miss his entire rookie season.

Johnson spent the first nine weeks of the 2008 regular season on the Titans' practice squad.

=== Indianapolis Colts ===
Johnson was signed to the Indianapolis Colts' active roster from the Tennessee Titans' practice squad on November 4, 2008.

=== Tennessee Titans (second stint) ===
On May 13, 2013, Johnson agreed to terms with the Titans, reuniting him with the team that drafted him. Johnson was on hiatus from football in 2014.

=== New England Patriots ===
On December 31, 2014, Johnson signed a future/reserve contract with the New England Patriots. Johnson was released on August 27, 2015.

== NFL career statistics ==
Legend
**Bold**	Career high

=== Regular season ===
Year	Team	Games		Tackles					Interceptions					Fumbles			
Year	Team	GP	GS	Cmb	Solo	Ast	Sck	TFL	Int	Yds	TD	Lng	PD	FF	FR	Yds	TD
2008	IND	8	4	13	11	2	0.0	0	0	0	0	0	0	0	0	0	0
2009	IND	15	**15**	**34**	**23**	11	1.0	2	0	0	0	0	0	0	0	0	0
2010	IND	14	2	26	20	6	0.5	1	0	0	0	0	0	0	**1**	0	0
2011	IND	**16**	12	21	9	**12**	0.0	2	0	0	0	0	**2**	**1**	0	0	0
2012	IND	14	13	26	19	7	0.0	0	0	0	0	0	0	0	0	0	0
2013	TEN	**16**	6	22	15	7	**3.0**	**4**	0	0	0	0	1	0	0	0	0
		83	52	142	97	45	4.5	9	0	0	0	0	3	1	1	0	0

=== Playoffs ===
Year	Team	Games		Tackles					Interceptions					Fumbles			
Year	Team	GP	GS	Cmb	Solo	Ast	Sck	TFL	Int	Yds	TD	Lng	PD	FF	FR	Yds	TD
2008	IND	1	1	**4**	2	**2**	0.0	0	0	0	0	0	0	0	0	0	0
2009	IND	**3**	**3**	**4**	**3**	1	0.0	0	0	0	0	0	0	0	0	0	0
2012	IND	1	1	2	2	0	0.0	0	0	0	0	0	0	0	0	0	0
		5	5	10	7	3	0.0	0	0	0	0	0	0	0	0	0	0
