= Eddie Cusic =

American blues guitarist, singer and songwriter (1926–2015)

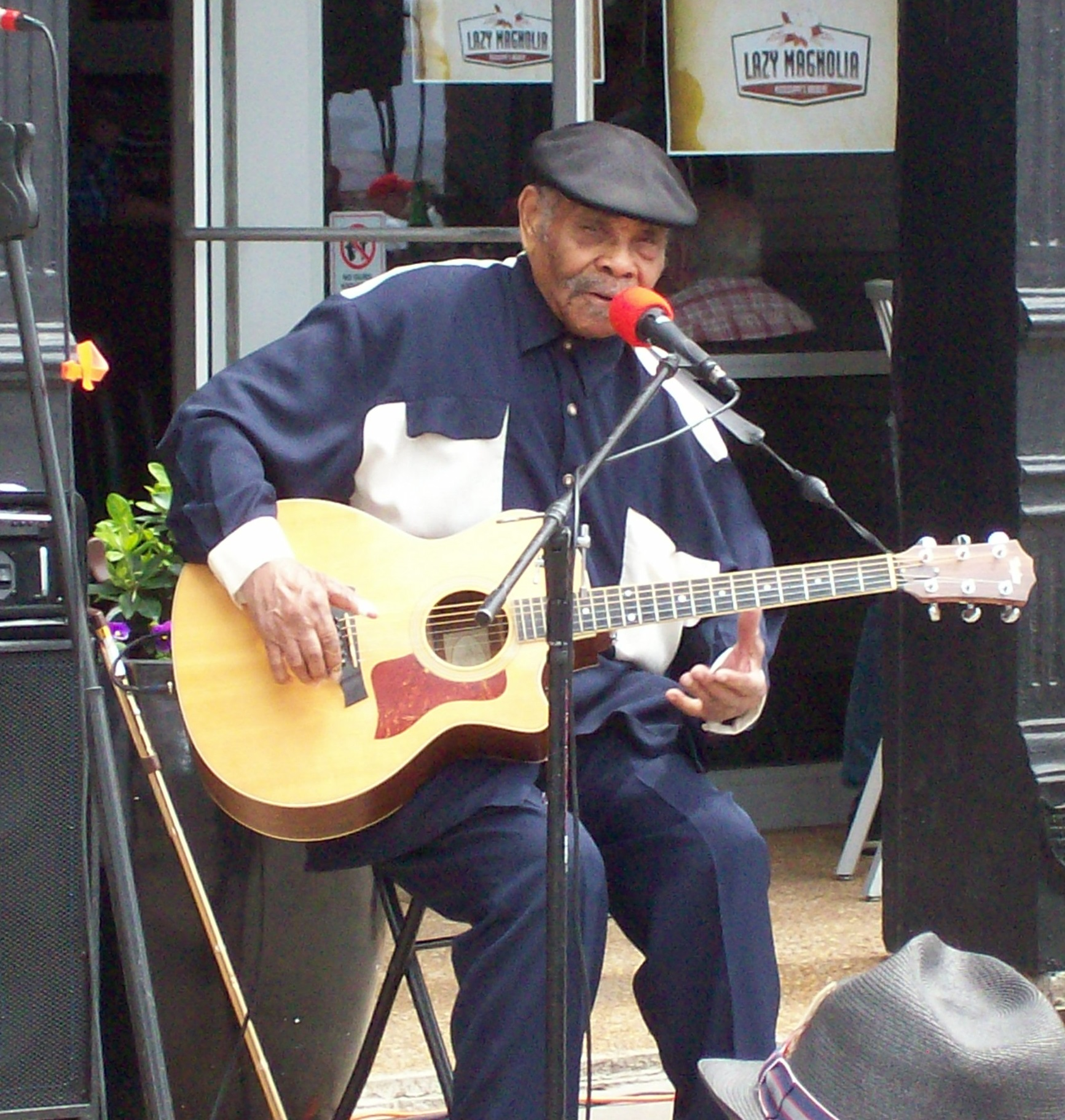
- Cusic performing in 2014

Background information
- Born: January 4, 1926; Leland, Mississippi, U.S.
- Died: August 11, 2015 (aged 89)
- Genres: Mississippi blues, electric blues
- Occupations: Guitarist, singer, songwriter
- Instruments: Guitar, vocals
- Years active: 1950s–2015
- Label: HighTone Records

Eddie Cusic (January 4, 1926 – August 11, 2015) was an American Mississippi blues guitarist, singer, and songwriter. His small body of recorded works includes some erroneously credited to "Eddie Quesie" and "Eddie Cusie". Cusic had musical connections with Little Milton and with James "Son" Thomas.

== Life and career ==
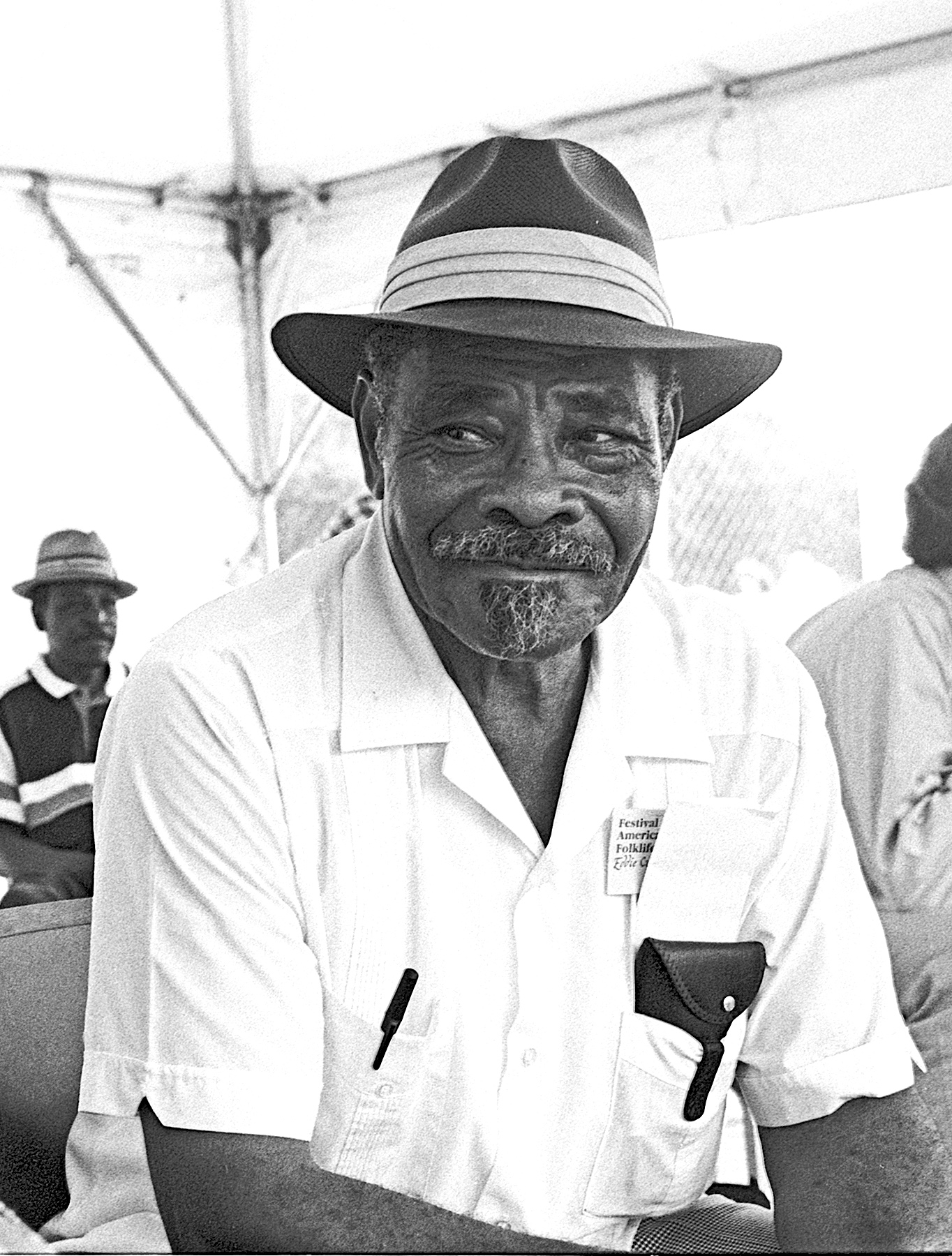
Eddie Cusic at the Smithsonian Folklife Festival, 1991.

Cusic was born in Wilmot, Mississippi, due south of Leland, Mississippi, in 1926. Growing up in a farming community, he was inspired to play the blues after hearing adults playing at family gatherings. He graduated from playing the diddley bow to a Sears acoustic guitar. In the early 1950s, he formed the Rhythm Aces, a three-piece band, which played throughout the Mississippi Delta. One member of the group was Little Milton, whom Cusic taught to play the guitar. Following service in the United States Army, which began in 1952, Cusic settled in Leland and found employment as a laborer and tractor driver at Delta Branch Agricultural Research Station in Stoneville, Mississippi. When it was discovered that he was adept at working on motors, he was placed in the shop there as a mechanic, where he remained until his retirement. In the 1970s, Cusic performed with James "Son" Thomas at regular engagements. Together they recorded "Once I Had a Car", which appeared on the compilation album Mississippi Delta & South Tennessee Blues (1977). He retired from full-time work in 1989, and having been urged by his good friend Thomas, Cusic returned to performing with an acoustic guitar. He appeared at the Mississippi Delta Blues and Heritage Festival in Greenville, Mississippi, the Sunflower River Blues Festival, the Smithsonian Folklife Festival and the Chicago Blues Festival.

In 1998, Cusic made a "field recording" at his house in Leland and delivered versions of several blues standards in his own pure Mississippi blues styling. The recording included cover versions of "Good Morning Little Schoolgirl", "Big Boss Man", "(I'm Your) Hoochie Coochie Man" and "Catfish Blues". AllMusic noted that the resultant album, I Want to Boogie, was "a strong debut that also makes the first new 'blues discovery' since the halcyon days of the 1960s". It was released by HighTone Records. A reworked version, containing several different tracks, was released in 2012, entitled Leland Mississippi Blues.

C2C sampled the vocals from Cusic's, "You Don't Have to Go" for their 2012 track, "Down the Road".

Cusic died of prostate cancer on August 11, 2015, aged 89.

== Discography ==
Year	Title	Record label
1998	I Want to Boogie	HighTone
2012	Leland Mississippi Blues	HighTone

== See also ==
- List of electric blues musicians
