= African American Museum (Dallas) =

American art museum, founded 1974

Coordinates: 32.7792°N 96.7643°W

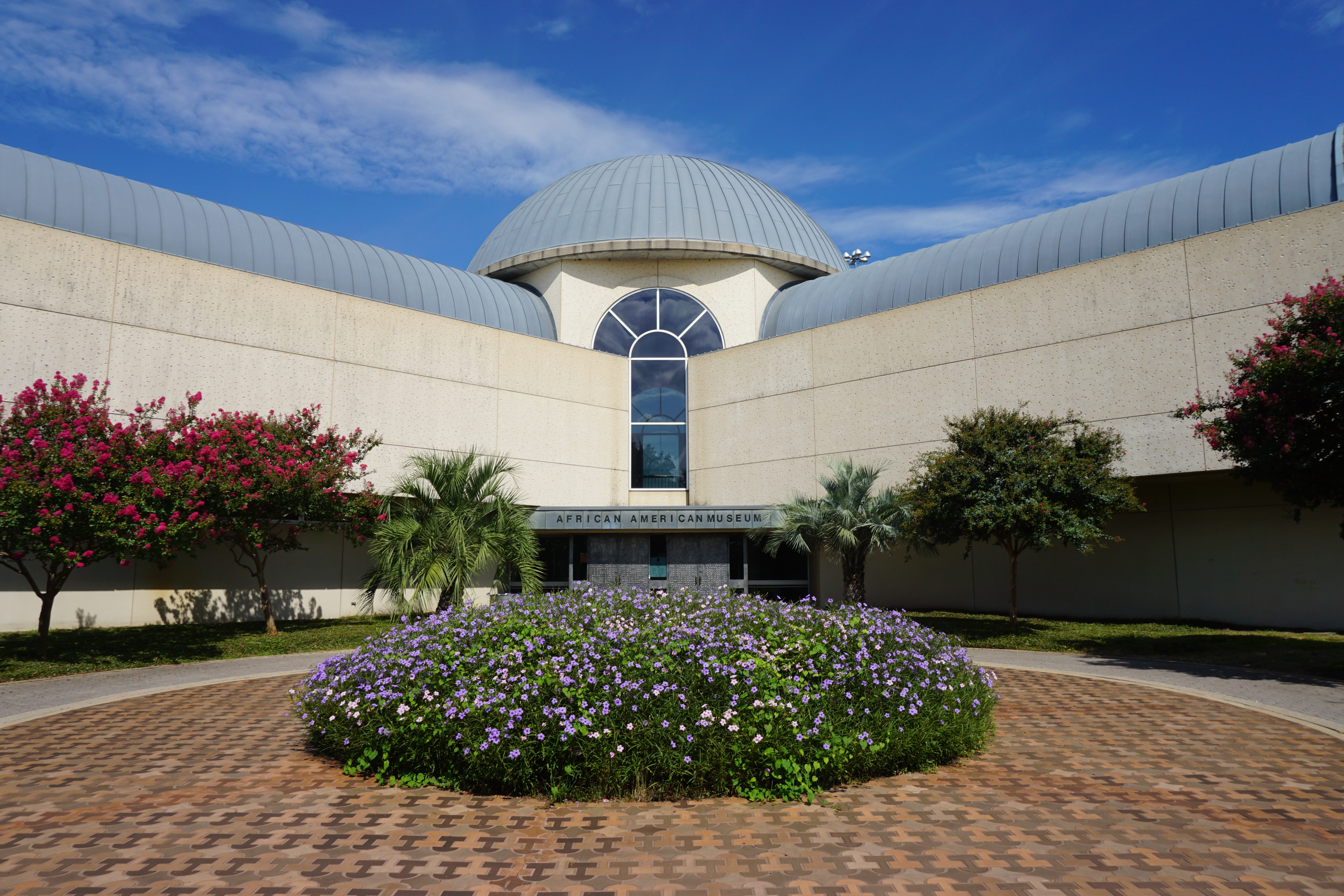
The exterior of the African American Museum in Fair Park, Dallas

African American Museum of Dallas is an American art museum located at 3536 Grand Avenue in Fair Park, Dallas, Texas. The museum was founded in 1974 and has operated independently since 1979. The 7 million dollar structure which is now its home, was funded through private donations, and a 1985 Dallas city bond election, which provided 1.2 million towards its construction. The 38,000-square-foot (3,500 m^{2}) structure, built in the shape of a cross, is made of ivory-colored stone. Natural materials and design motifs are used throughout the museum in a manner reminiscent of pre-industrialized cultures of the African continent.

== History ==
The African American Museum of Dallas was established in 1974 as a part of the Special Collections at Bishop College, a historically black college which closed in 1988. The Museum has operated independently since 1979. The $7 million edifice was funded through private donations and a 1985 Dallas City bond election that provided $1.2 million for the construction of the new facility. The Museum is the only one of its kind in the Southwestern United States devoted to the preservation and display of African American artistic, cultural and historical materials. It also boasts having one of the largest African American Folk Art collections in the U.S.

The Museum's operators say they strive to present a meaningful experience to children and adults who do not normally visit art museums. The museum houses a rich heritage of American art and history in four vaulted galleries that are augmented by a research library. The Museum's permanent collections include African art; African American art; magazine, historical, political, and community archives. Visitors can also experience African American culture through many educational and entertaining programs that are frequently presented in an "educational plaza", which includes a theater and classrooms.

== Collections ==
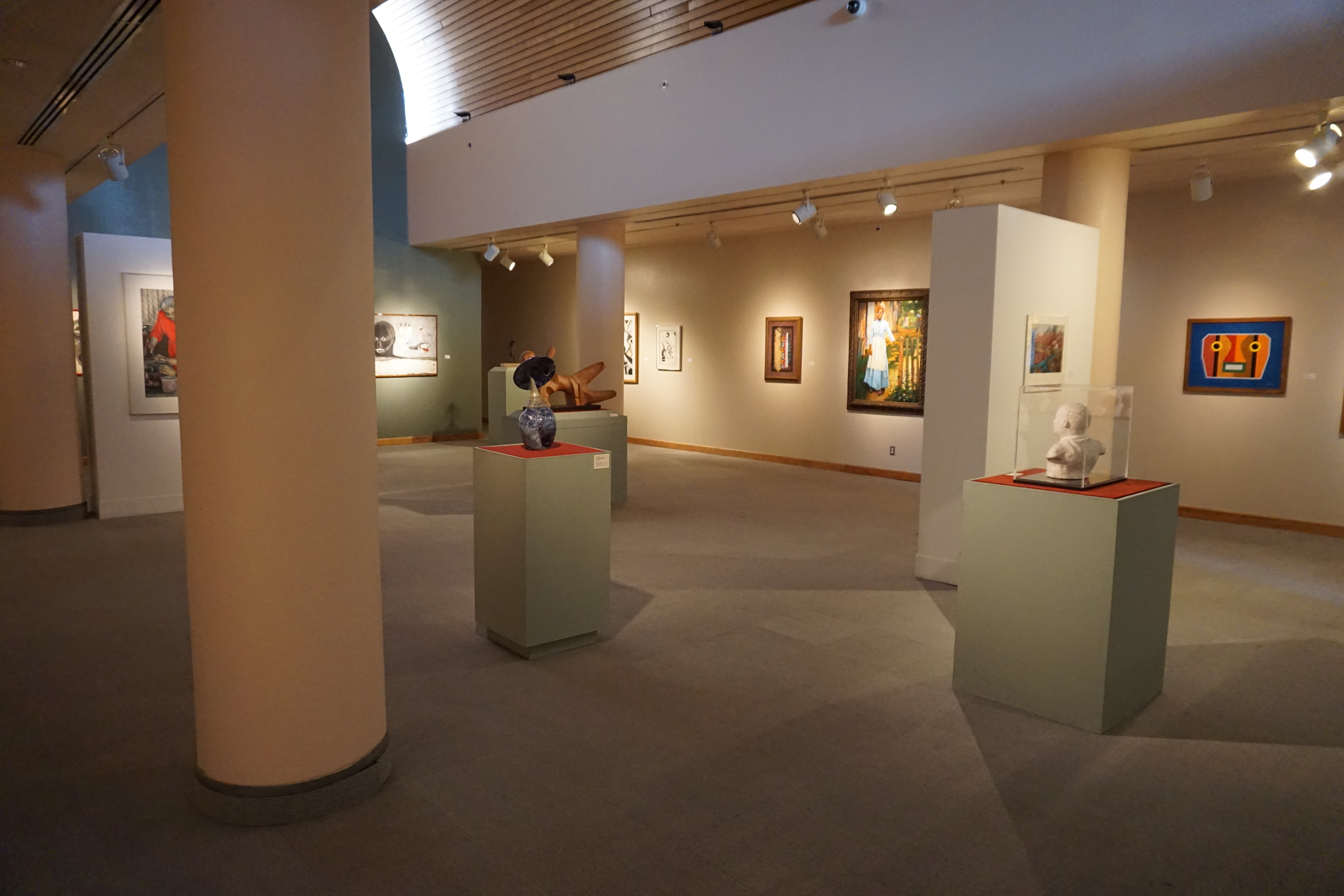
The GENESIS: Local African American Artists exhibition at the African American Museum, August 2016

The current museum building occupies virtually the same site as the Texas Centennial Exposition's Hall of Negro Life. It boasts a permanent collection that consists of the works of such highly regarded African American artists as Romare Bearden, Jacob Lawrence, Larry D. Alexander, John T. Biggers, Clementine Hunter, Benny Andrews, Edward Mitchell Bannister, Welmon Sharlhorne, and Arthello Beck.
