= 930 Poydras =

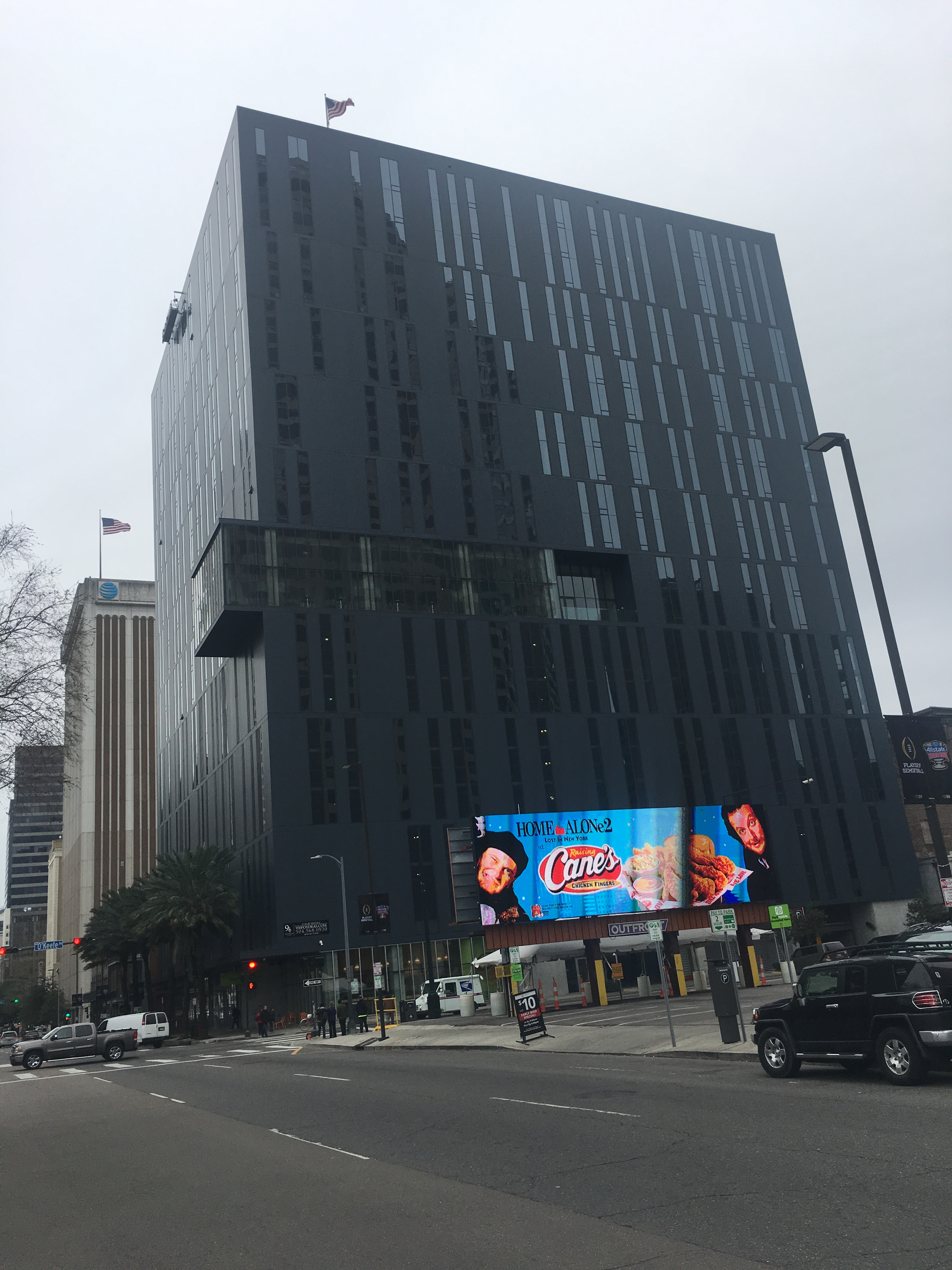
- 930 Poydras from the west along Poydras Street
- Interactive map of the 930 Poydras area

General information
- Type: Residential
- Architectural style: Modernism
- Location: 930 Poydras Street or 500 O'Keefe Avenue, New Orleans, Louisiana, United States
- Coordinates: 29.9502157°N 90.0741332°W
- Construction started: 2007
- Completed: 2010
- Cost: US$65 million
- Client: Brian Gibbs Development, LLC

Height
- Height: 270.31 ft (82.4 m)

Technical details
- Floor count: 21
- Floor area: 462,000 sq ft (42,921 m^{2})

Design and construction
- Architect: EskewDumezRipple
- Structural engineer: Morphy Makofsky Inc
- Civil engineer: Morphy Makofsky Inc
- Other designers: Mechanical Construction Co (Mechanical Engineer)
- Main contractor: Gibbs Construction Company

Other information
- Parking: 467

Website
- 930poydras.com

930 Poydras is a 21-story, 270.31-foot (82.4 m) residential skyscraper in New Orleans, Louisiana. Located on Poydras Street, the main thoroughfare in the city's Central Business District (CBD), it is the tallest building completed in the city in the 2010s and the first residential skyscraper completed in the city following Hurricane Katrina. Some sources affirm that the building was financed via Gulf Opportunity Zone financing that was enacted by the United States Congress to aid in the recovery from Katrina, while other sources state that alternative financing was used. The building's construction was the subject of a court battle regarding damage to surrounding buildings. Nonetheless, the building's design, which was scaled back from early plans, has won many awards.

== Details ==
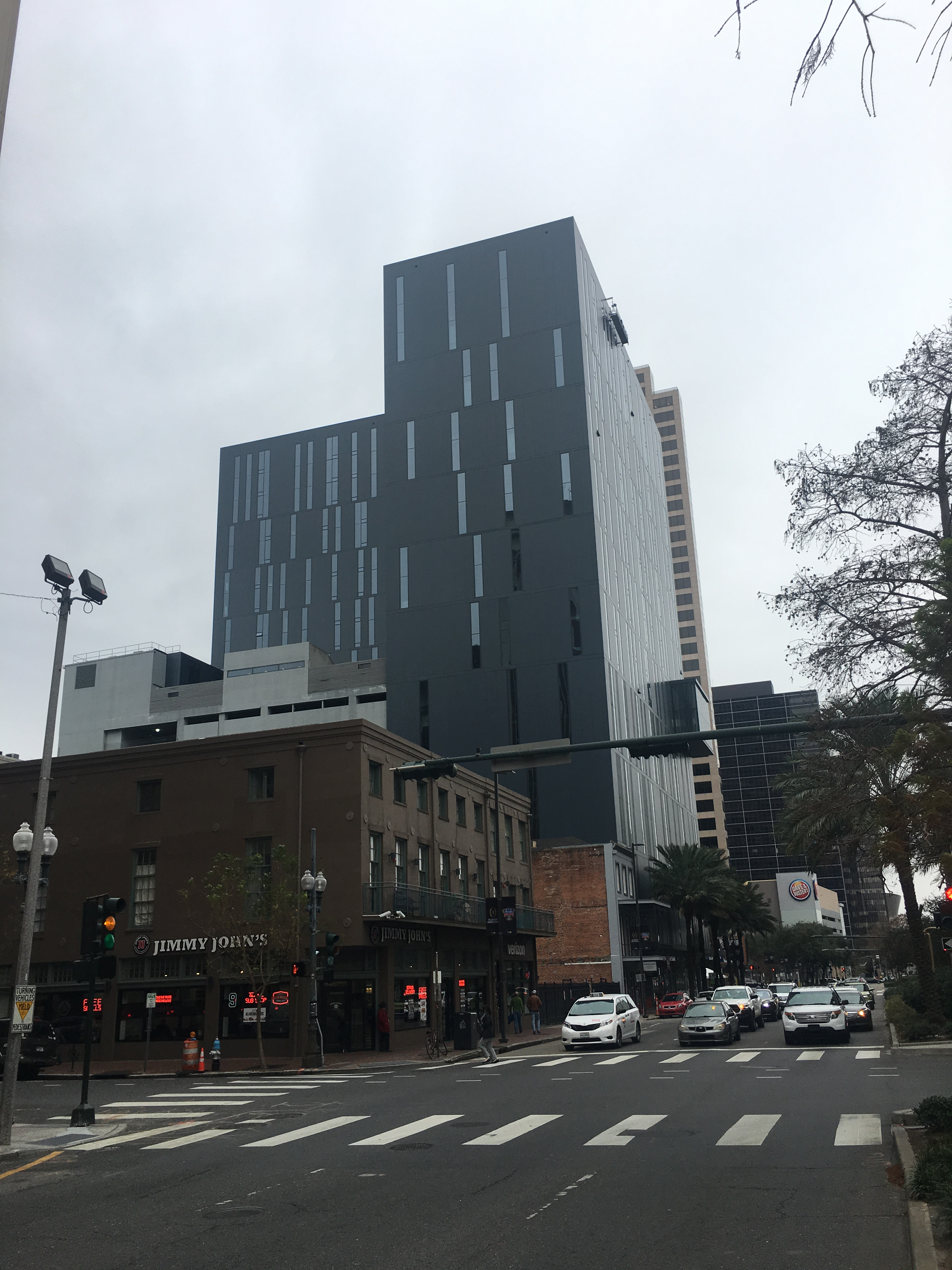
930 Poydras from the east along Poydras Street

The building is the first residential high-rise constructed in downtown New Orleans following the landfall of Hurricane Katrina in August 2005. In fact, it had been over a generation since a new-construction residential high-rise had been built in downtown New Orleans. Poydras Street is the main corridor of the New Orleans Central Business District, and 930 Poydras is the first ever residential building in the CBD portion of Poydras. Developed by Brian Gibbs, the building is the second residential structure (One River Place) with an address on Poydras Street. It is the tallest building completed in the city in the 2010s and the most recently completed skyscraper.

The building which was originally planned to have 37 floors, was scaled back to 35% glass skin from an all-glass structure due to financial considerations. The building was also scaled back from 476.25 feet (145.2 m) to 270.31 feet (82.4 m). Designed by EskewDumezRipple, the building has 462,000-square-foot (42,921 m^{2}) of mixed-use space, including ground floor retail and 250 residential apartments above a 500-car garage. Located at the intersection of Poydras and O'Keefe Streets, the structure is composed of 146 one-bedroom units, 99 two-bedroom units and five townhouses. The structure has 8 floors of parking spaces. Steve Dumez served as lead design architect of the 21-story L-shaped structure.

During construction, the adjacent three-story building which is among the National Register of Historic Places listings in Orleans Parish, Louisiana and is owned by the Birdsall Law Firm was said to have endured structural damage. This led to a lawsuit in Orleans Parish Civil District Court, but a judicial stay of construction was denied. Instead, the judge ruled that a monetary compensation would be determined after construction was completed.

The ground floor and parking garage elevators lead to the 9th floor and another set of elevators from the 9th floor leads to the residential units. All common tenant amenities are located on the double-height 9th floor, which includes a coffee bar and movie screening lounge inside as well as an outdoor pool and covered fitness center. The narrow pool has a tiered-seating pool deck. There are five two-story townhouses on the south side of the building with direct pool deck access. The 9th floor atrium lobby and its communal spaces are intended to be a social space reminiscent of the French Quarter courtyard, according to Dumez. In addition to the gathering space, the continuous skin from parking to residences, has been critically acclaimed. The design has won numerous awards, and EskewDumezRipple won the American Institute of Architects 2014 Architecture Firm Award.

It was funded based on Congressional incentives intended to promote recovery. Design and construction were expedited to meet the December 2009 sunset clause, that required that the building begin service by December 31, 2009. The financing combined tax credits and Gulf Opportunity Zone incentives according to a February 2009 story in The Times-Picayune by Kate Moran, while a January 2009 story in The Times-Picayune by Robert Travis Scott claimed that the GO Zone bonds were not used when an alternate funding source was found. Although the first tenants did not take full occupancy until March 2010 and 100% occupancy of the 250 apartments was not achieved until July 2010, partial temporary occupancy was granted just before the deadline. The building is financed by Federal and state new-market tax credits for the garage and United States Department of Housing and Urban Development's 221(d)(4) loans for the apartment residences.

== See also ==
- List of tallest buildings in New Orleans
