= Ruth Thompson Dickins =

American socialite and murderer

Ruth Idella Thompson Dickins (June 9, 1906 - January 22, 1996) was an American socialite convicted of the 1948 murder of her mother, Idella Thompson.

== Early life and family ==
Dickins, born Ruth Idella Thompson on June 9, 1906, was raised in Leland, Mississippi. Her father, Joseph Wood Thompson, was a pioneer planter and cotton merchant in Washington County who operated the Lewis, Archer, and Perrin Plantations and the Leland Mercantile Company, served as the treasurer of the Leland Business League and the Leland Law and Order League, served as president of the Board of Mississippi Levee Commissioners, and served on the city's Board of Alderman. Her mother, Idella Elizabeth Long Thompson, was a prominent Mississippi Delta socialite and the daughter of Dr. John A. Long and Virginia Stovall Long. She and her family attended the First Baptist Church of Leland.

Dickins grew up in her family's mansion, a large Queen Anne style house located at 111 North Deer Creek Drive West in Leland. She lived in the house with her parents, sister, two brothers, and a cousin. In 1920, the family home was renovated in the Colonial Revival style by the T.J. Harvey & Company. During the Great Mississippi Flood of 1927, the grounds of the family home flooded, but water only rose to the top step of the porch.

Dickins' father, Joseph Wood Thompson, died in 1939 after being shot in his house. According to court transcripts, Dickins claimed her father had committed suicide, possibly due to financial struggles during the Great Depression. After her father's death, Dickins' mother sold their house to James Rabun Jones and Josie Pattinson Jones, a distant cousin, and moved into the Jones' old house down the street.

== Personal life ==
Dickins attended Hollins College in Roanoke, Virginia, graduating in 1928. On January 24, 1929, she married John William Dickins (December 8, 1901 - March 13, 1977), a prominent cotton merchant and planter, whom she met while he stayed with her family in the 1920s. Mr. Dickins, the son of a wealthy doctor, was a graduate of Mississippi College, where he was a star baseball player and student body president, and later founded the John Dickins Cotton Company. Dickins and her husband purchased a lot of her family's property, including their 1800-acre plantation, after the death of her father, to help her mother with finances.

Dickins gave birth to her first daughter, Dell Elizabeth Thompson Dickins, on September 10, 1934. A second daughter, Dorothy Jane Dickins, was born on October 28, 1938. Their family lived in a mansion on North Deer Creek Drive, a few doors down from her mother's house. Dell married Vincent Scoper, future Mississippi senator, on February 11, 1956. Dell died on January 5, 2023.

Dickins was described as a "sportswoman" who enjoyed fishing and hunting. She was reportedly close to her mother, often helping her with household duties and collecting rent on her behalf from farming tenants.

Dickins died of heart failure on January 22, 1996 in Greenville, Mississippi.

== Murder of Idella Thompson ==
On the afternoon of November 17, 1948 Idella Elizabeth Long Thompson was brutally murdered, hacked to death with gardening shears, having been hit in the head between 150 and 200 times. Some of her fingers were severed and there were lacerations on her arms. Dickins did not provide an official statement to the sheriff's office until after her mother's funeral. According to Dickins' court statement, her mother had asked her to come over and help prune a shrub. Dickins claimed that she fetched a pair of gardening shears from her own garage and went to her mother's house, leaving the shears on a porch heater while going in to pour herself a glass of water. Once inside, Dickins claimed that her mother asked her to fetch some paper shavings to help make a bed for her cat, who had just had a litter of kittens. Dickins then stated she went home, checked on her daughter who was ill, and gave dinner instructions to her cook, Beatrice Smith, before heading back to her mother's house. She claimed that she opened the doors and, looking down the hall, saw her mother laying on the ground near the bathroom, covered with blood. Dickins told officers that when she approached her mother, who was still alive, a black man jumped out of the bathroom and attacked her with gardening shears. She claimed she was injured in the confrontation, but was able to retrieve the shears before the man reportedly ran out of the house. After the supposed attack, Dickins called her family doctor, who was also her uncle, who arrived at the scene and called the sheriff.

Dickins was not arrested right away as most of the town officials were initially focused on identifying the black man she had claimed attacked her and her mother. Black neighborhoods were heavily searched by the police, and cars driven by black people were stopped and checked before being allowed to drive outside city limits in Leland. There were gaps in Dickins' statement and, by January 1949, the district attorney took the case before a grand jury who indicted her for the murder of her mother. She pleaded not guilty and was released on a $10,000 bond posted by her husband. At this time, it became public that Dickins was the executor of her mother's will. Medical records of Idella Thompson were released and dispelled some of Dickins' claims about finding her mother still alive.

An all-white, all-male jury found Dickins guilty of murdering her mother. She was sentenced to life in prison, but served only six years before having her sentence suspended by the governor.
