= Mark Landis =

American painter (born 1955)

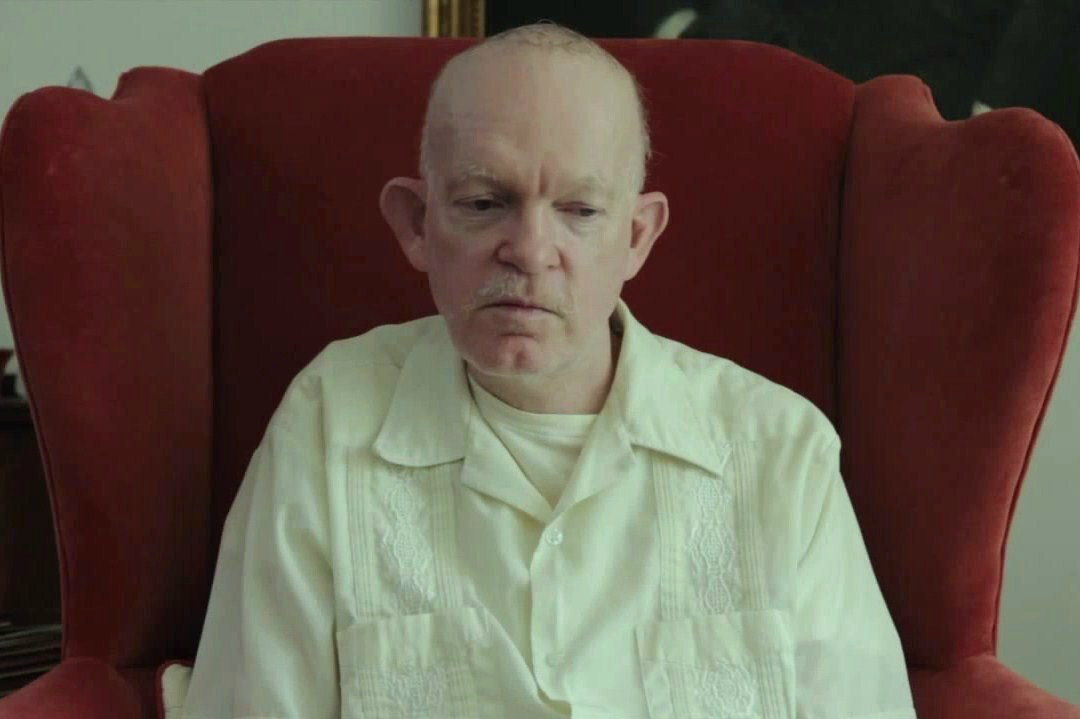
- Born: Mark Augustus Landis; March 10, 1955 (age 71); Norfolk, Virginia
- Education: Art Institute of Chicago
- Known for: Painting, forgery

Mark Augustus Landis (born 1955) is an American painter who lives in Laurel, Mississippi. He is best known for donating large numbers of forged paintings and drawings to American art museums.

== Life and career ==
Mark Landis was born in Norfolk, Virginia. His grandfather, Arthur Landis, was a director at the now defunct Auburn Automobile company. His father, Arthur Landis Jr., a lieutenant (and later lieutenant commander) in the US Navy, married his mother, Jonita (1930–2010), in 1952. Landis was born three years later, and the family moved around because of his father's various postings. Following assignments in the Philippines and Hong Kong, Arthur Landis Jr. was posted to NATO in Europe, where the family lived in Cap Ferrat (France), London, Paris, and finally Brussels, where Landis began forging stamp cancellations for his friends.

In 1968, the family returned to the United States, settling in Jackson, Mississippi. In 1971, Landis's father was diagnosed with cancer, from which he died the following year. At 17, Landis was deeply struck by the loss of his father and he was treated for 18 months in a Kansas hospital, where he was diagnosed with schizophrenic, paranoid, and psychotic disorders and catatonic behavior.

Landis attended art courses at the Art Institute of Chicago and then in San Francisco where, among other things, he worked on the maintenance of damaged paintings. He bought an art gallery, but it was not successful, and he lost money in a real-estate investment. In 1988, he decided to return to live with his mother and stepfather, James Brantley, in Laurel, Mississippi.

In the mid 1980s, Landis presented several forged artworks to a museum in California, attributing them to the renowned American 20th Century artist Maynard Dixon and claiming he wished to make a gesture that would please his mother and honor the memory of his father. These first successful attempts at art forgery convinced him to repeat the feat. For more than 20 years, Landis donated all kinds of faux pieces of art to institutions in the United States, including more than 50 museums. He generally chose smaller museums, which did not have the same means of detailed analysis as the larger ones. While not all institutions were duped, the whole process went largely unnoticed. Landis even donated up to six copies of the same work to different museums.

During this period, Landis also produced original pieces; some have been sold through Narsad Artworks, which sells work by artists with mental illness. As of 2013, it was still possible to buy note cards bearing a work entitled Magnolias by Landis (which copies a work by Martin Johnson Heade without credit).

Landis lived at more than 15 different addresses between 1985 and 2000. Patsy Hollister, Narsad co-founder, believes Landis probably is more bipolar than schizophrenic, with an ability to paint extremely fast. Says Landis, talking about icons: "I gave to hundreds of churches." Landis is also said to have worked in animation and advertisement.

Landis' success derives not so much from the perfection of his faux artworks (sometimes a basic test exposes the forgery) as from his ability to copy all kinds of styles, his choice to imitate lesser-known artists and his ability to play the role of an eccentric but sincere philanthropist. Moreover, museums tend not to authenticate gifts as carefully as works they buy.

== Investigation ==
In 2007, Landis offered his copies of several works to the Oklahoma City Museum of Art, among them a watercolor by Louis Valtat, a harbor scene by Paul Signac, a self-portrait by Marie Laurencin, an oil painting by Stanislas Lépine, and a drawing by Daumier. The registrar, Matthew Leininger, investigated the pieces and discovered a very similar Signac had been offered to the SCAD Museum of Art. A press release had even noted the donation of the same Signac, Avery and Laurencin. It also provided Mark Landis's real name. Leininger investigated further, and discovered Landis had tricked more than 60 museums in 20 states, using a number of aliases including Stephen Gardiner, Father Arthur Scott (a Jesuit priest), Father James Brantley (his stepfather's name), Mark Lanois (one letter different from his own name), Martin Lynley, and John Grauman. Leininger warned other museums, providing available photos of Landis. At this stage, the investigation remained confidential.

In September 2010, Landis went to the Paul and Lulu Hilliard University Art Museum in Lafayette, Louisiana, under the identity of Father Arthur Scott. He donated a painting by Charles Courtney Curran, citing the loss of his mother. The museum director, Mark A Tullos Jr., asked registrar Joyce Penn to check out the painting. When Penn examined it under ultraviolet light, the colors glowed suspiciously. In addition, a microscope observation showed a dot-matrix pattern, hinting that it was a photocopy of the original which had been projected on a board and then painted over. Penn dug deeper and linked up with Leininger's investigation.

In November 2010, The Art Newspaper published a comprehensive article on the matter, inspiring other publishers such as the Financial Times to follow suit. Despite these exposés, Landis has continued his forgeries intermittently, with attempted gifts in November 2010 to the Ackland Art Museum (as Father Arthur Scott); in September 2012 to William Carey University (as Martin Lynley); and in October 2012 to several southern museums (as Lynley and as John Grauman).

== Law infringement ==
It appears that in donating forgeries to art museums, Landis has not actually broken any laws, even though his activities were clearly deceitful. If he had sold the work to museums or taken a tax deduction on them, he might have fallen under federal art crime statutes. But the fact that he did not gain economically from his actions (apart from a few gifts from curators), and that he addressed his donations to specialists who had the expertise to detect his forgeries but did not, protected him in the eyes of the law. No legal action has been opened against him to date (as of 2014). As one art crimes expert put it: "Basically, you have a guy going around the country on his own nickel giving free stuff to museums."

== Exhibition ==
Both Tullos and Leininger wished to put an end to Landis's career as a forger, but could not. So Leininger and Aaron Cowan, director of the DAAP Galleries at the University of Cincinnati, set up an exhibition to address the general matter of art forgery, and specifically expose Landis's works. They collected some 60 pieces by Landis, who provided his "Jesuit priest" costume and some of his art books as well as attending the reception as guest of honor. Entitled "Faux Real", it took place in Spring 2012 at the Dorothy W. and C. Lawson Reed Jr. Gallery, University of Cincinnati. The organizers also set up a short video featuring Landis' most relevant paintings.

Most recently, Mark Landis' work was the subject of the exhibition "Creative Conscience" in New York City, curated by Wirth Galerie and hosted by Salomon Arts Gallery, and later extended in Luxuny Atelier, a penthouse overlooking Bryant Park. The exhibition aimed to separate Landis' work from his story as a forger, presenting it instead on its own artistic merit. The exhibition brought up themes of appropriation, authenticity, and the way value is created. It was taken a step further during a panel discussion involving the directors of the film alongside Landis and NFT experts, when the idea of creating a collection of NFTs from Landis' work was brought up and debated.

== Painters and authors copied ==
- Hans von Aachen
- Walter Inglis Anderson (Flock of Ducks)
- William-Adolphe Bouguereau
- Mary Cassatt (sketch of a girl, copied for a reporter)
- Charles Courtney Curran (On the Beach, Lake Erie and Three Women)
- Stuart Davis (Houses Along a Canal)
- Maynard Dixon (portrait of an Indian)
- John Hancock (letter)
- Robert Henri (Drawing of a Girl)
- Paolo Landriani (Christ on the Way to Calvary)
- Marie Laurencin (Portrait of a Young Girl and Self Portrait)
- Stanislas Lépine (Terrassiers au Trocadero)
- René Magritte
- Alfred Jacob Miller (Head of a Sioux)
- José Clemente Orozco (Estudio de tres mujeres desnudas)
- Pablo Picasso (Portrait de Lola, Soeur de l'artiste)
- Egon Schiele
- Everett Shinn (Nymph on the Rocks)
- Paul Signac (Le Trieux and Tugboat and Barge in Samois)
- Louis Valtat (Etudes de Femme Assise)
- Antoine Watteau (A Woman Lying on a Chaise Longue)
- Unknown French artist

== Works in his own name ==
- Pastoral Peace
- Woman and Boys on Beach
- Young Girl
- Sisters
- Woman and Children in Water
- Ride in the Park
- Tree Alone
- Autumn Scene
- Blue Dress
- Magnolias
- Pink Dress
- Tropical Scene
- Vase of Flowers
- White Dress

Landis now also creates commissioned original portraits from photographs and donates a portion of each commission toward mental illness awareness.

In 2020 he appeared on the HGTV show Home Town when the makers of the program commissioned a Landis original portrait of a homeowner's dogs to be hung in the historic Laurel house they were restoring.

== Documentary ==
Landis is the subject of the documentary Art and Craft, directed by Sam Cullman and Jennifer Grausman and co-directed by Mark Becker. It premiered at the Tribeca Film Festival in 2014, and was acquired by Oscilloscope Laboratories for North American distribution. The film examines Landis's personality, his history, his forgeries and the process he goes through to create and donate them. The film also features Leininger and Cowan. The documentary had its television premiere on September 25, 2015, on the PBS program POV.
