= Johnie Cooks =

American football player (1958–2023)

No. 98, 99
- Position: Linebacker

Personal information
- Born: November 23, 1958; Leland, Mississippi, U.S.
- Died: July 6, 2023 (aged 64); Memphis, Tennessee, U.S.
- Listed height: 6 ft 4 in (1.93 m)
- Listed weight: 243 lb (110 kg)

Career information
- High school: Leland (MS)
- College: Mississippi State (1977–1981)
- NFL draft: 1982: 1st round, 2nd overall pick

Career history
- Baltimore/Indianapolis Colts (1982–1988); New York Giants (1988–1990); Cleveland Browns (1991)

Awards and highlights
- Super Bowl champion (XXV); PFWA All-Rookie Team (1982); First-team All-American (1981); 2× First-team All-SEC (1980, 1981); Second-team All-SEC (1978)

Career NFL statistics
- Sacks: 32
- Interceptions: 4
- Fumble recoveries: 5
- Stats at Pro Football Reference

Johnie Earl Cooks (November 23, 1958 – July 6, 2023) was an American professional football player who was a linebacker for 10 seasons in the National Football League (NFL). Cooks was selected by the Baltimore Colts as the second overall pick in the 1982 NFL draft. He played from 1982 to 1991 for the Colts, New York Giants, and Cleveland Browns. He was a member of the Giants when they defeated the Buffalo Bills 20–19 in Super Bowl XXV. Cooks played college football for the Mississippi State Bulldogs.

== Early life ==
Johnie Cooks was born on November 23, 1958, in Leland, Mississippi. Cooks was one of nine children and the son of a sharecropper. He was given his first opportunity to play football after his mother borrowed five dollars from her land owner to pay for his physical. At Leland High School, Cooks starred on the football team, basketball team, baseball team, and competed on the track and field team.

On the football team, Cooks played both offensive and defensive line. As a senior, he was named to the 1976 All-Delta Conference team and earned a spot on the 1977 Mississippi High School All-Star game. Representing the North team, he was switched to linebacker and led the game in tackling with seven tackles and six assists.

== College career ==
At Mississippi State, Cooks was a four-year letterman in football and graduated with a degree in physical education. As a freshman in 1977, Cooks appeared in all 11 games and recorded one interception. The Bulldogs had started the 1977 season ranked at #18 in the AP poll, but after suffering losses to #13 Florida and #16 Kentucky, they dropped from the top-25 rankings. Cooks' interception came in the penultimate game of the season, where he picked off LSU quarterback John Crane. Mississippi State finished the 1977 season at 5–6, with a 2–4 record against Southeastern Conference (SEC) opponents.

In 1978, Cooks led Mississippi State with 73 tackles, 42 assists and 14 tackles for loss. He was named to the AP All-SEC Second-Team. The Bulldogs went 6–5 on the season, but recorded upsets against #15 Florida State and #17 LSU.

Prior to the 1979 season, Cooks was listed on several pre-season All-America watch lists. However, Cooks suffered a knee injury late in the season opener against Memphis State, which sidelined him for the rest of the 1979 season. Cooks was granted a hardship redshirt status, meaning the 1979 season did not count toward his college eligibility.

In 1980, Cooks returned from his injury and regained his starting linebacker position. He was named to the All-SEC First-Team and helped lead the Bulldogs to a 9–3 record and #19 ranking in the final AP poll. That year he turned in game-changing performances in back-to-back weeks. Against Auburn, Cooks recorded a career-high 24 tackles as Mississippi State won 24–20. The next week against #1 ranked Alabama, Cooks again had a 20-tackle performance and forced the game-clinching fumble near the goal line to secure the 6–3 upset. Mississippi State earned a spot in the 1980 Sun Bowl against #9 Nebraska that ended in a 17–31 defeat.

In his 1981 senior season, Cooks remained as a pillar of the Mississippi State defense. He again led the Bulldogs in tackles and added an interception in a 28–7 win against Florida. In a week six 14–10 upset of #13 ranked Miami (FL), Cooks recorded seven tackles, six assisted tackles, two sacks, and one forced fumble. He was named the AP SEC Lineman of the Week. Cooks was named to the 1981 ALL-SEC First-Team and was a 1981 All-American. The Bulldogs went 8-4 and faced Kansas in the 1981 Hall of Fame Classic. Cooks and the Mississippi State defense held Kansas to 35 rushing yards, and won 10–0. Cooks was named the Defensive Most Valuable Player of the game.

During his college career, Cooks amassed 373 tackles, 241 of those unassisted. He was named to the Mississippi State University Athletics Hall of Fame in 1991 and was inducted into the Mississippi State Ring of Honor at Davis Wade Stadium in 2011.

== Professional career ==
Cooks was the second overall draft choice, selected in the first round of the 1982 NFL draft by the Baltimore Colts. Cooks played his first seven seasons for the Colts before he was released and signed by the New York Giants. After three seasons with the Giants, Cooks finished his career with the Cleveland Browns.

=== Baltimore/Indianapolis Colts (1982–1988) ===
Cooks joined Baltimore on a six-year, $1.6 million contract that included a $200,000 signing bonus. In Cooks' strike-shortened rookie season, he started in eight of the nine games played, registering 63 tackles, one sack, and one fumble recovery. Cooks finished sixth in the AP Defensive Rookie of the Year voting, but earned a spot on the 1982 PFWA NFL All-Rookie Team along with Colts defensive lineman Leo Wisniewski and punter Rohn Stark. Despite Cooks' productive season, the Colts finished winless at 0-8-1 under first-year head coach Frank Kush.

In 1983, Cooks was moved to the outside linebacker position, the first of many position switches throughout his career. In the season opener, Cooks sealed a 29–23 overtime victory against the New England Patriots with a 52-yard fumble return for a touchdown. Cooks publicly expressed frustration with Kush throughout the season, which led to speculation that he wanted to be traded. The Colts started the season at 5–4, before losing five of their last seven games and finishing the season at 7–9. However, Cooks still was productive on the field with 67 tackles, five sacks, one interception, and one fumble recovery.

Prior to the 1984 season, the Colts moved from Baltimore to Indianapolis and Cooks remained with the team. Cooks recorded 11.5 sacks in the team's first season in Indianapolis, which led the Colts. His best game of the season came in week 13, where he recorded a Colts' record 4.5 sacks against Los Angeles Raiders quarterback Jim Plunkett. The Colts went 4–12 on the season, firing head coach Frank Kush before the season finale.

Under new coach Rod Dowhower, Cooks and the Colts went 5–11 in the 1985 season. Cooks posted his best professional season with 95 tackles, five sacks, and one interception for the year. His interception came in week one against Ken O'Brien and the New York Jets. He then recorded one sack each in five separate games throughout the season.

In 1986, the Colts started the season at 0-13 and fired Dowhower with three weeks remaining in the season. After being replaced by Ron Meyer, they finished the season with three straight wins and a 3–13 overall record. Cooks had one sack and one interception on the season.

In the final preseason game of the 1987 season, Cooks was injured when he was poked in the eye while making a tackle. He did not suffer permanent damage, but internal bleeding forced him to be sidelined. He missed the first two games of the season before the 1987 NFPLA player's strike took effect. Games scheduled for week three were cancelled, and Cooks sat out the three "strike team" games in weeks four through six. Upon returning at the strike's conclusion, Cooks appeared in 10 total games and recorded five sacks and one interception on the season. The Colts made the playoffs for the first time in Cooks' career after winning the AFC East Division. The Colts lost in the first round to the Cleveland Browns.

Cooks began the 1988 season with the Colts, but after acquiring linebacker Fredd Young in a trade with the Seattle Seahawks, Cooks was waived on September 13, 1988, following the first week of the regular season.

=== New York Giants (1988–1990) ===
Cooks was claimed off waivers by the New York Giants on September 14, 1988. Four days after being acquired, Cooks started for the Giants in a victory over the Dallas Cowboys. In his first year with the Giants, Cooks appeared in 13 games with four starts. He recorded 14 tackles one sack on the season. The Giants went 10–6 on the season, and finished second in the NFC East Division.

In 1989, Cooks recorded 35 tackles and one sack in 13 starts. The Giants won the NFC East with a 12–4 regular season record. They lost in the Divisional Round of the playoffs to the Los Angeles Rams.

The 1990 season was Cooks' best as an individual and team. Cooks had 31 tackles and one sack on the season, including a 10-tackle game against the Washington Redskins in week eight. The Giants started the season at 10–0, finishing at 13-3 and repeating as NFC East champions. They defeated the Chicago Bears and San Francisco 49ers in the NFC playoffs to advance to the Super Bowl. In Super Bowl XXV, the Giants beat the Buffalo Bills 20–19.

Cooks was released by the Giants after the 1990 season and the retirement of head coach Bill Parcells.

=== Cleveland Browns (1991) ===
Former Giants defensive coordinator Bill Belichick was named head coach of the Cleveland Browns prior to the start of the 1991 season. Belichick advocated for Cooks and signed him as a veteran presence for the 1991 season. Cooks only appeared in two games with the Browns, and lingering injuries caused Cooks to retire after the 1992 season.

== Post-football career ==
Cooks was hired by Mississippi State as an Assistant Athletic Director in 1992, where he served for seven years. He left Mississippi State after the 1999 football season to join the administration of Mississippi Governor Ronnie Musgrove as a legislative liaison. Cooks left the Governor's office in January 2001, and went to Alcorn State University where he was Special Assistant to the athletic director for Fundraising and Marketing.

While still playing in the NFL, Cooks and his family opened Jonie's Mug and Cone in Louisville, Mississippi, named for his daughter.

== Personal life and death ==
Cooks lived in Starkville, Mississippi, for many years following his retirement from the NFL. He ran several community programs in Starkville, mentoring youth through the Boys and Girls Club and youth football leagues.

Cooks was inducted into the Mississippi Sports Hall of Fame in 2004.

Cooks died on July 6, 2023, at the age of 64 from complications of a stroke.
