= EskewDumezRipple =

- Industry: Architecture
- Founded: 1989
- Headquarters: New Orleans, Louisiana
- Key people: Allen Eskew, Steve Dumez, and Mark Ripple
- Number of employees: 50+
- Website: www.eskewdumezripple.com

EskewDumezRipple is an American architecture practice based in New Orleans, Louisiana founded by Allen Eskew in 1989. Steve Dumez and Mark Ripple became partners in 2000 along with three others. The firm rebranded as Eskew+Dumez+Ripple in 2003, then as EskewDumezRipple in 2018.

They were the recipients of the AIA 2014 Architecture Firm Award.

== Notable projects ==
- New Orleans Riverfront Development Plan, New Orleans, LA
- Louisiana State History Museum (now Capitol Park Museum), Baton Rouge, LA
- 930 Poydras Residential Tower, New Orleans, LA
- Prospect.1 Welcome Center, New Orleans, LA
- Hilliard Art Museum, Lafayette, LA
- Thaden School, Bentonville, AR
- Bruce Museum, Greenwich, CT
- Audubon Aquarium & Insectarium Renovation, New Orleans, LA
- Goldring Woldenberg Riverfront Park, New Orleans, LA
- Olney Theatre Center for the Arts, Olney, MD
- George & Scheller Towers at Georgia Institute of Technology, Atlanta, GA
- Burden Museum & Gardens Welcome Center, Baton Rouge, LA
