= Stanislas Lépine =

French painter

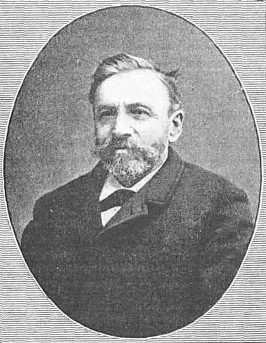
- Portrait of Stanislas Lépine by Louis Chrétiennot (1893)
- Born: October 3, 1835; Caen, France
- Died: September 28, 1892 (aged 56); Paris, France
- Known for: Painting

Stanislas Victor Edouard Lépine (October 3, 1835 – September 28, 1892) was a French painter who specialized in landscapes, especially views of the Seine.

== Biography ==
Lépine was born in Caen. An important influence in his artistic formation was Corot, whom he met in Normandy in 1859, becoming his student the following year.

Lépine's favorite subject was the Seine, which he was to paint in all its aspects for the rest of his life. He is considered a harbinger of the future, heralding the evolution of traditional plein-air landscape painting into Impressionism and modern art. Lépine was part of a movement of artists who painted outside, developing a new visual vocabulary that captured the changeability of nature, an “impression” of a landscape replacing a literal reproduction of it. He participated in the First Impressionist Exhibition, held at Nadar's in 1874, although he is generally not considered an Impressionist. His paintings are placid in mood and are usually small in scale. Lépine was awarded a gold medal at the Exposition Universelle of 1889 for his painting Pont de l'Estacade. He died suddenly in Paris in 1892.

== Gallery ==
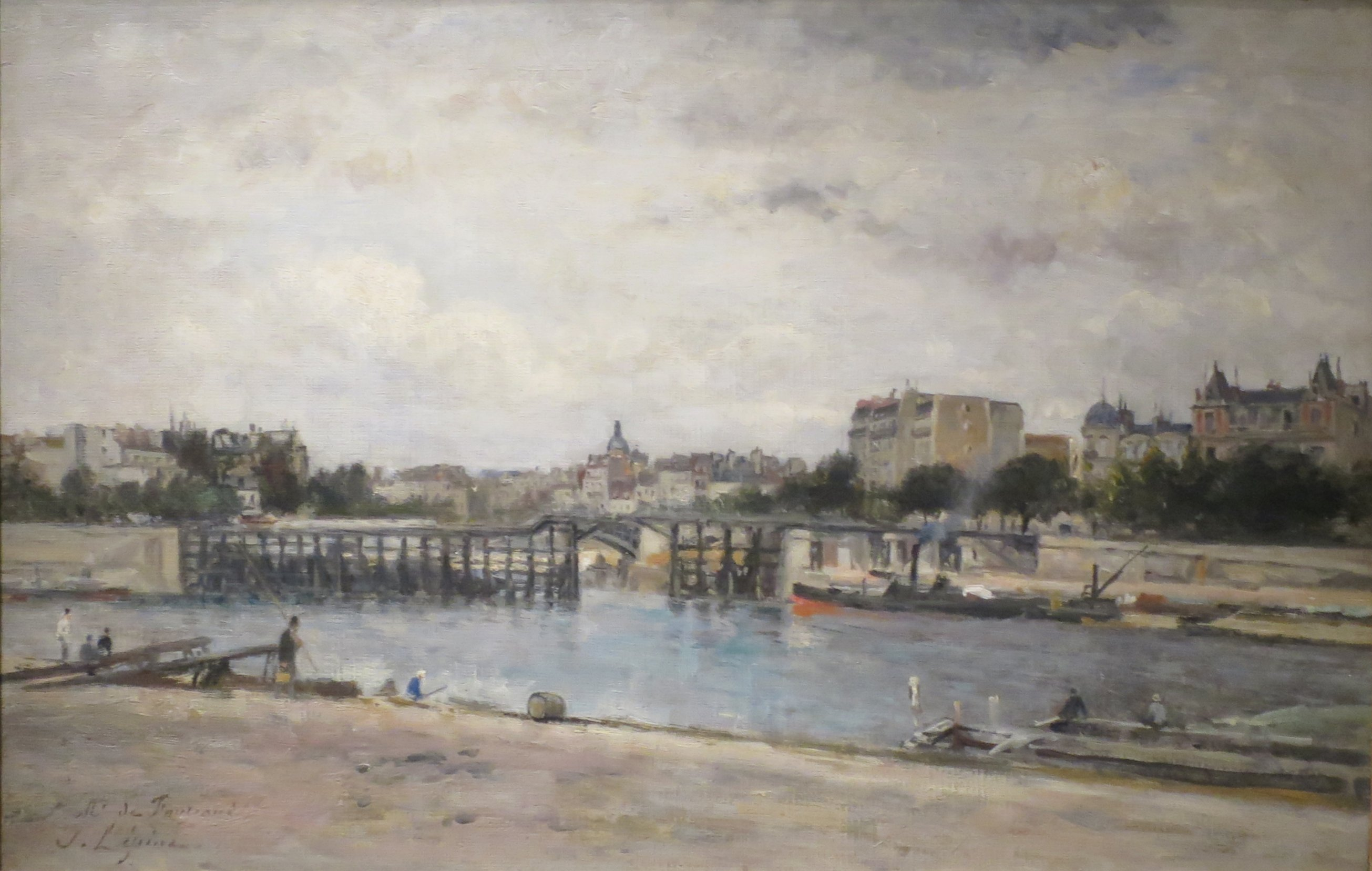
The Pont de l'Estacade, Paris, c. 1880-1884, Norton Simon Museum

Pont de la Tournelle, Paris, 1862, National Gallery of Art

The Seine at the Confluence of the Marne, c. 1882, Legion of Honor, San Francisco
