= Sulton Rogers =

American folk artist

Sulton Rogers (1922 – April 5, 2003) was a Mississippi folk artist who spent most of his life in Syracuse, New York working at a chemical plant. He moved back to Oxford, Mississippi in 1995 and lived there until he died.

Rogers referred to his carvings as "haints" and primarily carved humans with oversized features. The oversized features included multiple eyes, animals coming out of body parts, and extra breasts. He would also carve multiple related carvings known as "haint houses". These pieces sometimes included dollhouses that would be filled with the human carvings. While he normally carved people, he would also carve animals.

"Now some people don’t know what to make of my carving. I got a couple of friends that come to the house, they don’t go to the cellar ‘cuz I usually have coffins sitting around there. You know the fellow I rent from, he don’t go down there. He says if anything would break, you fix it because I ain’t going down there. Then if he does come, he says if you gonna make things then cover them up so I can’t see ‘em, put a sheet or something on ‘em. One night he come to the door and I was trying to put a wig on those dead people in the coffin. He told me I was an idiot for doing stuff like that."

– Sulton Rogers, 1991 (Artist's Alliance- It'll Come True).

His pieces are the part of permanent collections at the University of Mississippi Museum of Art, the African American Museum, the Pérez Art Museum Miami, and the Paul and Lulu Hilliard University Art Museum. His carvings have also appeared in the Dallas Museum of Art, New Orleans Museum of Art, and the American Visionary Art Museum. Collectors should be aware that auction houses and some publications misspell his name as "Sultan Rodgers".

== Family life ==
Rogers was married in 1941 at age 19 and had a son named Van. He later married Ardeula in 1945 and they conceived seven children together, RV, Allie B., Willie Sulton, Eddie, Sammie, Lossie, and Loretta. He also fathered Bobby, Roy, Jackie, Katie, and Jimmy. Although he left his family in Mississippi to seek employment in New York, he reunited with his family many years before his death.

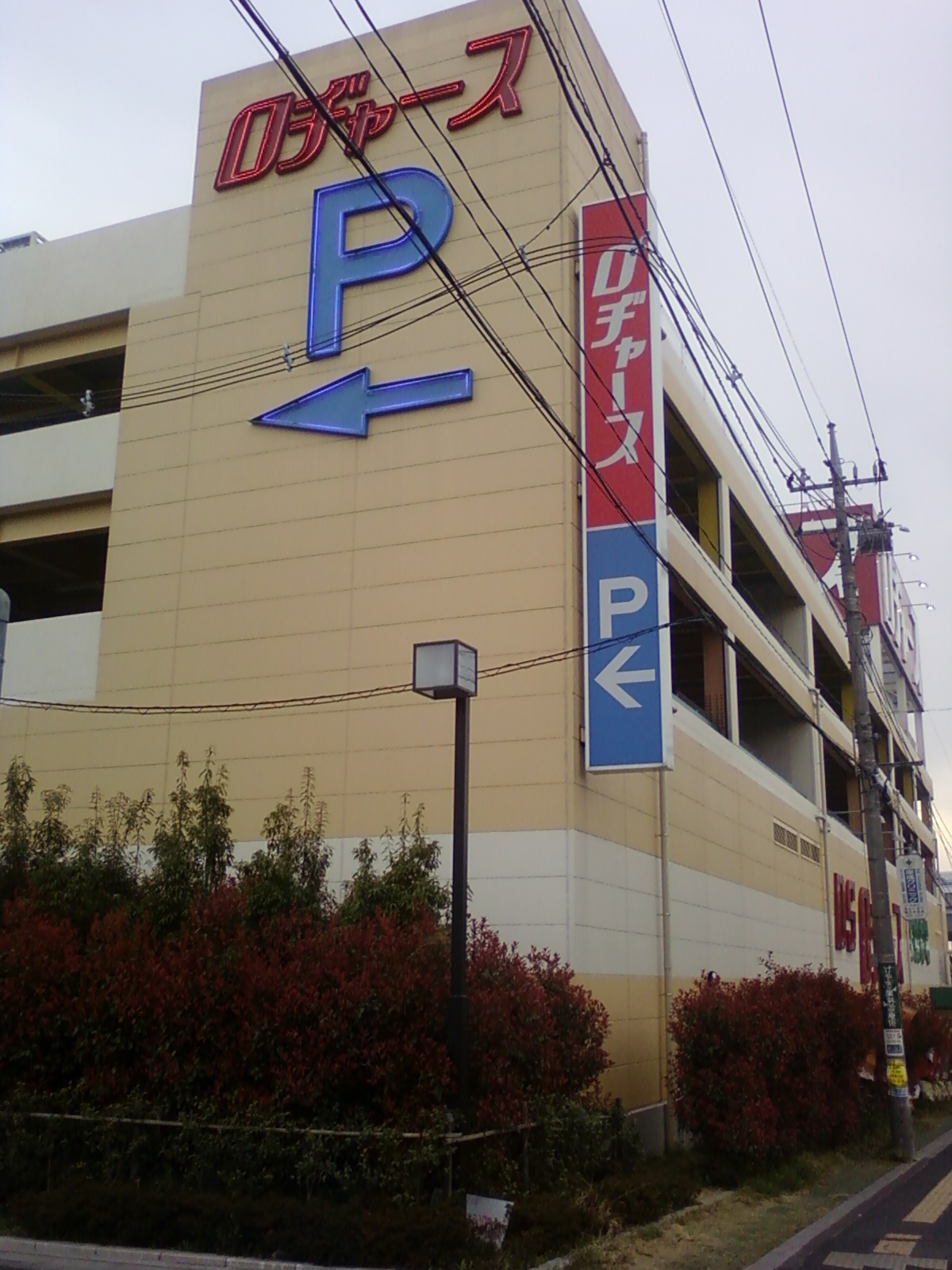
