= Leland School District =

School district in Mississippi

The Leland School District is a public school district based in Leland, Mississippi (USA). The central district office is located at 408 East 4th Street, Leland, MS 38756.

== Schools and other institutions ==
- Leland High School
- Edna M. Scott Elementary School
- Leland School Park
- Leland Early Learning Initiative
- Leland Career and Technical Center

== Demographics ==
=== 2023-24 school year ===
There were a total of 687 students enrolled in the Leland School District during the 2023-24 school year. The gender makeup of the district was 48.6% female and 51.4% male. The racial makeup of the district was 89.96% African American, 4.66% White, 0% Hispanic, 0% Asian, and 3.06% two or more races.

== See also ==
- List of school districts in Mississippi
