= Welmon Sharlhorne =

American visual artist (born 1952)

- Born: 1952 (age 72–73); Houma, Louisiana, U.S.
- Other names: Welman Stovall, Welmon Sharlehorne, Uncle Shadow
- Occupation: Visual artist
- Movement: Outsider art

Welmon Sharlhorne (born 1952) is an American visual artist. He is self-taught, and is considered an Outsider artist. Sharlhorne is a native of Houma, Louisiana, and has also lived in the French Quarter in New Orleans. He is nicknamed Uncle Shadow, and has gone by the name Welman Stovall.

== Biography ==
Welmon Sharlhorne was born in Houma, Louisiana, he was one of fourteen children born into an African-American family. At the time of his youth, the area was under Jim Crow laws and was racially segregated.

Sharlhorne has spend a significant portion of his life incarcerated and started making drawings while serving time at Louisiana State Penitentiary, where he was released in 1995. His artwork from prison was often created on manila folders. He uses the symbolism of clocks in much of his artwork.

In 2019, Sharlhorne's work was included in the group show What Carried Us Over: Gifts from Gordon W. Bailey Collection among twenty five artists at the Pérez Art Museum Miami.

Sharlhorne's work is in permanent museum collections, including the Pérez Art Museum Miami, Smithsonian American Art Museum, Ogden Museum of Southern Art, Los Angeles County Museum of Art, the African American Museum of Dallas, and the High Museum of Art.
