= Leland, Mississippi =

- City
- Downtown Leland in 2026
- Interactive map of Leland, Mississippi
- Coordinates: 33.404834°N 90.890925°W
- Country: United States
- State: Mississippi
- County: Washington
- Settled: 1834
- Incorporated: February 20, 1886
- Founder: Captain James Alexander Ventress Feltus (1840–1908)

Government
  - Type: Mayor–council
  - Mayor: John Lee

Area
  - Total: 3.633 sq mi (9.409 km^{2})
  - Land: 3.583 sq mi (9.281 km^{2})
  - Water: 0.051 sq mi (0.131 km^{2}) 1.38%
- Elevation: 121 ft (37 m)

Population (2020)
  - Total: 3,988
  - Estimate (2024): 3,627
  - Density: 1,113/sq mi (429.7/km^{2})
- Time zone: UTC−6 (Central (CST))
  - Summer (DST): UTC−5 (CDT)
- ZIP Code: 38756
- Area code: 662
- FIPS code: 28-40280
- GNIS feature ID: 2404910
- Website: cityofleland.com

Leland is a city in Washington County, Mississippi, United States. It is located within the Mississippi Delta, on the banks of Deer Creek. The population was 3,988 at the 2020 census. It was once a railway town and had long been a center of cotton culture, which is still an important commodity crop in the rural area. It was once considered the second-largest city in Washington County in 1920 due to its rapid growth of residents, businesses, and schools.

Since before the Civil War, farming has been the basis of the local economy. There are several privately owned farms within and around the boundaries of the town. Mississippi State University and the United States Department of Agriculture (USDA) maintain an agriculture research station at Stoneville on Leland's outskirts. Other agricultural companies in the area are Lauren Farms BASF Stoneville Cotton, Bayer Crops Science, GreenPoint Ag, Azlin Seed Service, Corteva Agriscience, Pettiet Agricultural Services, Inc., Nutrien Ag Solutions, K-I Chemical U.S.A., Greenland Planting Company, Ayers-Delta Implement, Edward's Flying Service, Essie Patterson Farm Trucking, and Southern Seed Association. Cotton, soybeans, rice and corn are the leading commodity crops along with catfish.

A number of national and regionally noted blues musicians are from Leland. There are five Mississippi Blues Trail markers in Leland commemorating the small town's significant contribution to blues history. Highway 61, mentioned in numerous blues recordings, runs through the town and gives its name to the community's blues museum. Leland is the burial place of the folk artist and blues musician James "Son" Thomas, who lived for many years near the railroad tracks. Thomas is buried beneath a gravestone donated by Mt. Zion Memorial Fund, to which musician John Fogerty of Creedence Clearwater Revival was a yearly contributor.

Blues musician Johnny Winter spent part of his childhood in Leland. Winter's grandfather and father, a former mayor of Leland, operated J.D. Winter & Sons, a cotton business. One of the Blues Trail markers in Leland is dedicated to Winter.

The community is the childhood home of puppeteer Jim Henson, who was born in nearby Greenville, but raised in Leland. Here he created the character of Kermit the Frog, a Muppet. The city has a museum along the banks of Deer Creek celebrating Henson's accomplishments called the Jim Henson Exhibit.

Leland was selected as the site for the Mississippi Wildlife Heritage Museum, opened in 2016.

== History ==
The area in which Leland sits was once part of the Choctaw territory in the early 1800s. After the Second Choctaw Cession, which came from the Treaty of Doak's Stand of 1820, the land was fought over by the United States government and the Choctaw Indians during the American Civil War in which the Choctaw Indians sided with the Confederacy in order to fight the Union for the return of their land.

The territory that the town was built on was first settled on in 1834 by Samuel and Susan Jones, Mary Neely, and Malinda Breeland. A few years later, they deeded the land to the families of Connerly and Buckner. They made their home on the bank of Deer Creek on the Three Oaks Plantation. Soon other settlers came to live in Leland and the Stoneville area. To travel between both places at the time, people used boats to navigate on Deer Creek. There was even a drawbridge that was built by Leland settlers to be more closely connected with the people of Stoneville.

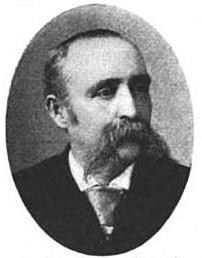
This is a photo of Captain James Alexander Ventress Feltus who was a captain in the American Civil War for the Confederacy. He is the founder of the town of Leland, Mississippi.

Years later, the Buckner and Connerly families moved away and sold their land to Judge James Rucks and William Yerger. The new owners maintained the land until the American Civil War. In 1869, their heirs quit claimed the land for release mortgages which passed to the hands of the Bank of Kentucky. After seven years, Mississippi native Captain James Alexander Ventress Feltus (1840–1908) bought the 900 acres of land for $12,000.

Captain James A. V. Feltus built his home at the "Three Oaks" and deeded a 100-foot right-of-way on the land to the Memphis and Vicksburg Railroad Company; however, no railway was built until 1885, when the right of way was given to the Louisville, New Orleans and Texas Railroad Company. Leland was one of two cities considered for a terminus of several railroad lines, most notably, the Louisville, New Orleans & Texas Railway. Captain John C. Calhoun, an enterprising and liberal owner of the Leland Plantation, pushed efforts to make Leland a primary candidate for the terminus.

Captain Feltus dedicated the original town of Leland by signing deeds that created streets from First to Eighth Streets, which included Main and Broad Streets as the east and west boundaries of the town. Accounts state that Captain Feltus named the town after Miss Leland McCutcheon, the mother of Feltus’ friend, Ruben Armstrong and fiancé of young traveling railroad auditor C. E. Armstrong. It would seem that both accounts state that both men asked Captain Feltus to name the town in her honor. The first store built in the town of Leland was the Greenley's Mens Store, owned by J. C. Greenley.

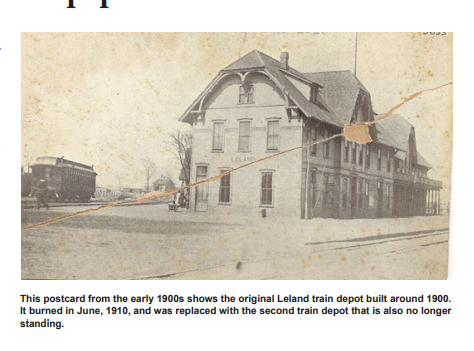
A snapshot of a newspaper clipping that shows a postcard of the old Leland Train Depot in the 1900s.

In January 1886, the citizens of the town drafted a charter to incorporate the town of Leland and sent it by mail to the representatives at Jackson, Mississippi. By February of that year, the charter was amended in bills H.B. 642 and H.B. 643 and was well on its way to making the town officially recognized as a city; it was approved on February 20, 1886. As the town continued to progress, it established its first newspaper publication, The Leland Record, and businesses were established, including retail, banks, law firms, other railway companies, grocers, innkeepers, landlords and more.

On October 11, 2025, a shootout between multiple people in downtown Leland left seven people dead and 19 others injured, 12 of whom suffered gunshot injuries. People had gathered in the area after a football game between Leland High School and Charleston High School and it was reportedly sparked by a disagreement among those involved in the shootout. As of January 2026, nine suspects have been arrested in connection to the shooting, and one suspect remained on the lam.

== Geography ==
According to the United States Census Bureau, the city has a total area of 3.633 square miles (9.41 km^{2}), of which 3.583 square miles (9.28 km^{2}) is land and 0.050 square miles (0.13 km^{2}) (1.38%) is water.

=== Climate ===
Leland has a humid subtropical climate (Köppen Cfa) with long, hot summers and short, mild winters.

Climate data for Leland, Mississippi (Stoneville Experiment Station) (1991–2020 normals, extremes 1930–present)
Month	Jan	Feb	Mar	Apr	May	Jun	Jul	Aug	Sep	Oct	Nov	Dec	Year
Record high °F (°C)	82 (28)	83 (28)	90 (32)	94 (34)	100 (38)	105 (41)	109 (43)	106 (41)	104 (40)	96 (36)	89 (32)	83 (28)	109 (43)
Mean maximum °F (°C)	72.0 (22.2)	75.7 (24.3)	81.6 (27.6)	87.7 (30.9)	92.6 (33.7)	96.8 (36.0)	98.6 (37.0)	99.5 (37.5)	96.8 (36.0)	90.0 (32.2)	81.5 (27.5)	74.6 (23.7)	100.2 (37.9)
Mean daily maximum °F (°C)	52.6 (11.4)	57.3 (14.1)	65.9 (18.8)	75.4 (24.1)	83.7 (28.7)	89.8 (32.1)	92.1 (33.4)	92.5 (33.6)	88.2 (31.2)	77.7 (25.4)	65.1 (18.4)	55.4 (13.0)	74.6 (23.7)
Daily mean °F (°C)	43.4 (6.3)	47.4 (8.6)	55.4 (13.0)	64.6 (18.1)	73.5 (23.1)	80.1 (26.7)	82.4 (28.0)	81.7 (27.6)	76.4 (24.7)	65.5 (18.6)	54.2 (12.3)	46.2 (7.9)	64.2 (17.9)
Mean daily minimum °F (°C)	34.3 (1.3)	37.6 (3.1)	44.9 (7.2)	53.8 (12.1)	63.4 (17.4)	70.4 (21.3)	72.7 (22.6)	70.9 (21.6)	64.6 (18.1)	53.3 (11.8)	43.3 (6.3)	37.1 (2.8)	53.9 (12.2)
Mean minimum °F (°C)	19.3 (−7.1)	24.4 (−4.2)	29.4 (−1.4)	38.8 (3.8)	49.5 (9.7)	60.7 (15.9)	65.4 (18.6)	63.4 (17.4)	50.2 (10.1)	37.8 (3.2)	28.1 (−2.2)	24.9 (−3.9)	17.4 (−8.1)
Record low °F (°C)	−5 (−21)	−5 (−21)	13 (−11)	29 (−2)	40 (4)	47 (8)	54 (12)	51 (11)	36 (2)	25 (−4)	15 (−9)	1 (−17)	−5 (−21)
Average precipitation inches (mm)	5.55 (141)	5.59 (142)	5.41 (137)	6.05 (154)	4.84 (123)	4.07 (103)	4.01 (102)	3.12 (79)	3.51 (89)	4.18 (106)	4.49 (114)	5.25 (133)	56.07 (1,424)
Average snowfall inches (cm)	0.2 (0.51)	0.2 (0.51)	0.0 (0.0)	0.0 (0.0)	0.0 (0.0)	0.0 (0.0)	0.0 (0.0)	0.0 (0.0)	0.0 (0.0)	0.0 (0.0)	0.0 (0.0)	0.0 (0.0)	0.4 (1.0)
Average precipitation days (≥ 0.01 in)	11.5	10.2	11.0	9.8	10.1	7.9	9.3	7.6	7.2	7.2	8.6	11.3	111.7
Average snowy days (≥ 0.1 in)	0.2	0.1	0.0	0.0	0.0	0.0	0.0	0.0	0.0	0.0	0.0	0.0	0.3
Source: NOAA

== Demographics ==
Historical population
Census	Pop.	Note	%±
1890	485		—
1900	762		57.1%
1910	1,547		103.0%
1920	2,003		29.5%
1930	2,426		21.1%
1940	3,700		52.5%
1950	4,736		28.0%
1960	6,295		32.9%
1970	6,000		−4.7%
1980	6,667		11.1%
1990	6,366		−4.5%
2000	5,502		−13.6%
2010	4,481		−18.6%
2020	3,988		−11.0%
2024 (est.)	3,627		−9.1%
U.S. Decennial Census; 2020 Census

=== 2020 census ===
As of the 2020 census, Leland had a population of 3,988, with 1,663 households and 1,032 families.

The median age was 40.2 years. 22.3% of residents were under the age of 18 and 17.8% were 65 years of age or older. For every 100 females there were 85.9 males, and for every 100 females age 18 and over there were 80.6 males age 18 and over.

0.0% of residents lived in urban areas, while 100.0% lived in rural areas.

There were 1,663 households in Leland, of which 30.1% had children under the age of 18 living in them. Of all households, 30.1% were married-couple households, 19.7% were households with a male householder and no spouse or partner present, and 42.7% were households with a female householder and no spouse or partner present. About 32.3% of all households were made up of individuals and 13.8% had someone living alone who was 65 years of age or older.

There were 1,902 housing units, of which 12.6% were vacant. The homeowner vacancy rate was 0.6% and the rental vacancy rate was 11.3%.

Racial composition as of the 2020 census
Race	Number	Percent
White	995	24.9%
Black or African American	2,857	71.6%
American Indian and Alaska Native	1	0.0%
Asian	17	0.4%
Native Hawaiian and Other Pacific Islander	2	0.1%
Some other race	9	0.2%
Two or more races	107	2.7%
Hispanic or Latino (of any race)	36	0.9%

=== 2013 ACS ===
As of the 2013 American Community Survey, there were 4,427 people living in the city. 74.3% were African American, 24.8% White, 0.1% Native American, 0.6% Asian, 0.1% from some other race and 0.2% from two or more races. 0.4% were Hispanic or Latino of any race.

=== 2000 census ===
As of the census of 2000, there were 5,502 people, 1,943 households, and 1,414 families living in the city. The population density was 2,670.2 inhabitants per square mile (1,031.0/km^{2}). There were 2,095 housing units at an average density of 1,016.7 per square mile (392.6/km^{2}). The racial makeup of the city was 32.01% White, 67.01% African American, 0.16% Native American, 0.13% Asian, 0.04% from other races, and 0.65% from two or more races. Hispanic or Latino of any race were 0.75% of the population.

There were 1,943 households, out of which 36.9% had children under the age of 18 living with them, 38.9% were married couples living together, 27.7% had a female householder with no husband present, and 27.2% were non-families. 24.2% of all households were made up of individuals, and 11.1% had someone living alone who was 65 years of age or older. The average household size was 2.82 and the average family size was 3.35.

In the city, the population was spread out, with 31.9% under the age of 18, 10.6% from 18 to 24, 26.3% from 25 to 44, 18.8% from 45 to 64, and 12.4% who were 65 years of age or older. The median age was 30 years. For every 100 females, there were 88.1 males. For every 100 females age 18 and over, there were 78.6 males.

The median income for a household in the city was $25,678, and the median income for a family was $28,926. Males had a median income of $26,184 versus $20,693 for females. The per capita income for the city was $11,681. About 24.0% of families and 27.5% of the population were below the poverty line.

== Arts and culture ==
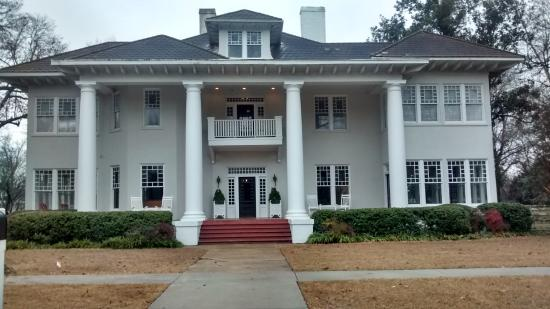
The Thompson House in Winter; A historic Bed and Breakfast located in Leland, Mississippi.

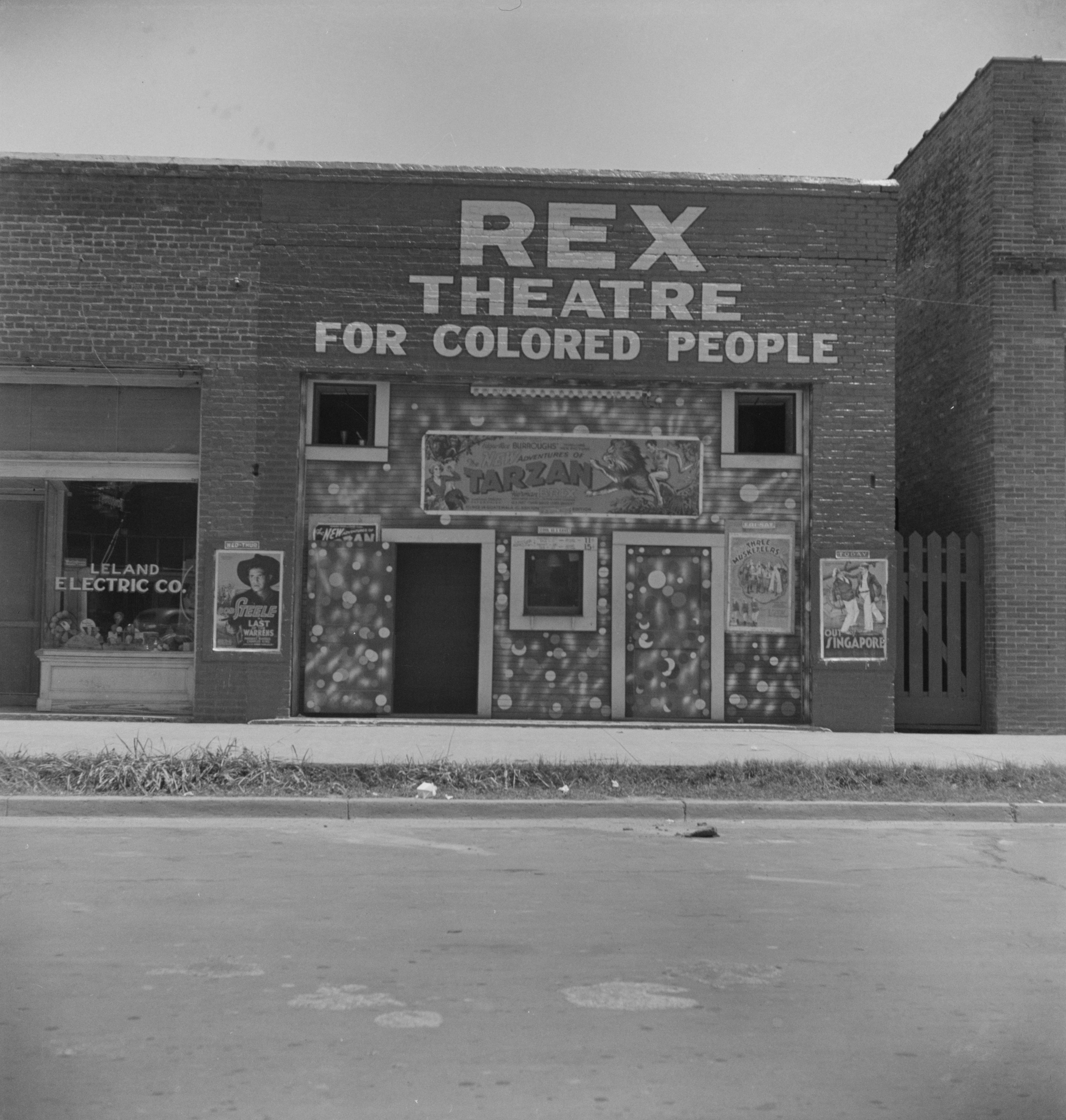
Rex Theatre for Colored People in Leland, 1937, by Dorothea Lange

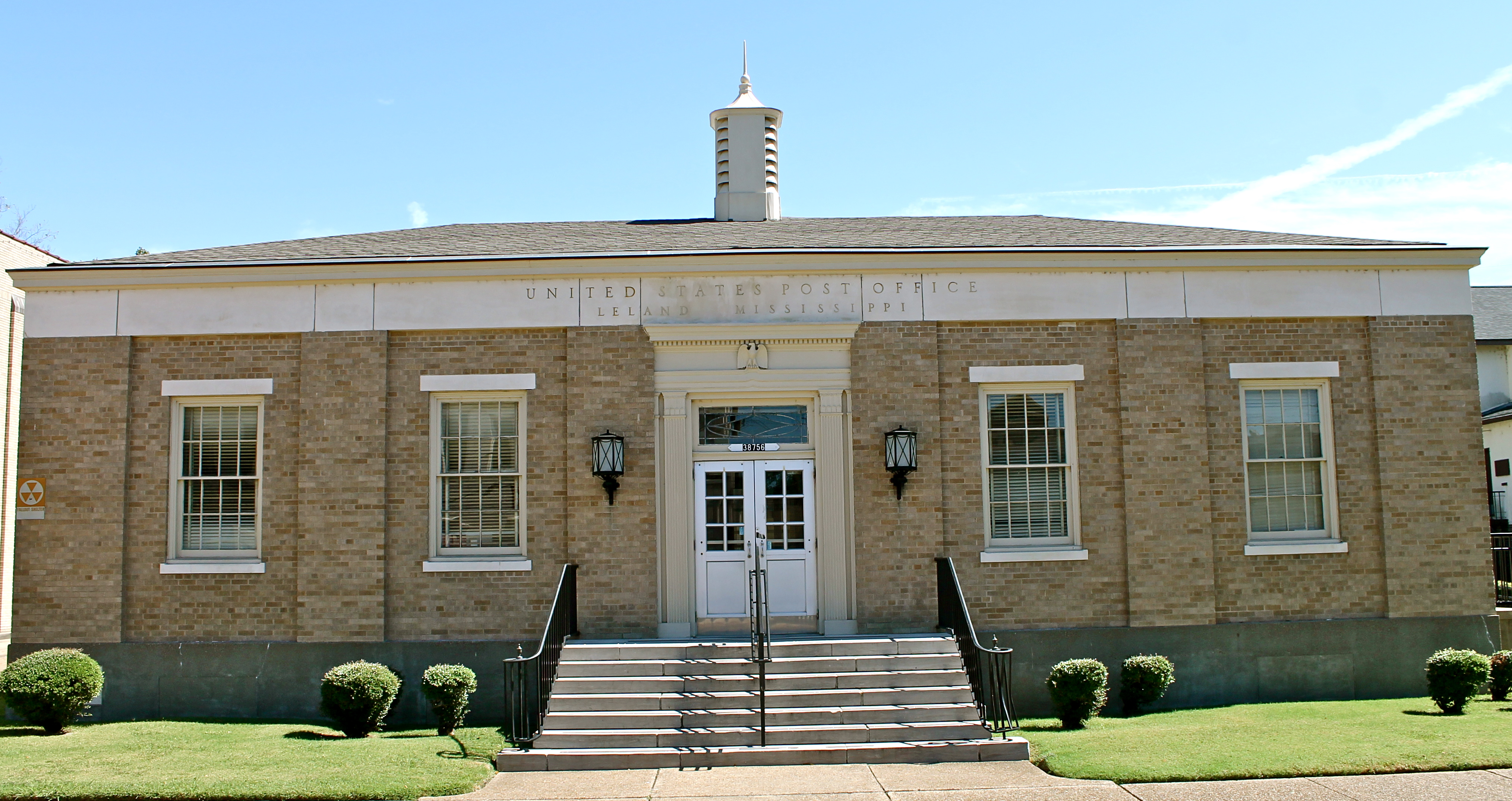
Post Office in Leland

=== Places of interest ===
- Mississippi Blues Trail Markers
- Mississippi Wildlife Heritage Museum
- Jim Henson Exhibit
- The Thompson House

== Education ==
The City of Leland is served by the Leland School District. Leland High School is the sole high school. Leland School Park is the sole middle school. Edna M. Scott Elementary is the sole elementary school.

== Media ==
The Leland Progress is the paper of record. Previous papers were the Leland Record (est.1886) and the Leland Enterprise (est.1901).

== Infrastructure ==
=== Health Care ===
The Witte Clinic and hospital served the Leland area from 1946 to 1949. It was then leased out to the city and named The Leland City Hospital in 1949 for a year. While no longer a hospital system since the 1980s, this facility is now named the Leland Medical Clinic.

== Notable people ==
- Douglas A. Blackmon, Pulitzer Prize-winning author of Slavery by Another Name, grew up in Leland.
- Johnie Cooks (1958–2023) football player at Mississippi State University and the NFL
- Ruth Thompson Dickins, socialite and convicted murderer
- Jim Henson, puppeteer and creator of the Muppets
- Thelma Houston, singer/actress, was born in Leland.
- Antonio Johnson, former professional football player
- Matt Miller A former Major League pitcher
- Wadada Leo Smith, jazz trumpeter and composer
- Bob Taylor, baseball player
- James "Son" Thomas, blues musician, gravedigger, and sculptor
- Johnny Winter, blues musician, spent part of his childhood in Leland

== In popular culture ==
A scene from the movie, O Brother, Where Art Thou? (2000), was filmed in Leland on the Columbus and Greenville Railway line. In the scene, the three escaping convicts try to jump aboard a freight train only to fail and catch a handcar driven by a blind old man who makes wild predictions about their future.
