= James Thomas (blues musician) =

American blues musician and sculptor (1926–1993)

- Thomas performing in Columbus, Mississippi, in the 1980s

Background information
- Also known as: James "Son Ford" Thomas
- Born: October 14, 1926; Eden, Mississippi, U.S.
- Died: June 26, 1993 (aged 66) Greenville, Mississippi, U.S.
- Genres: Delta blues
- Instruments: Guitar; vocals

James "Son" Thomas (October 14, 1926 – June 26, 1993) was an American Delta blues musician and sculptor.

== Biography ==
Thomas was born in Eden, Mississippi on October 14, 1926. While working in the fields, he began listening to blues on the radio. As a self-taught guitarist, he learned to play songs from older blues guitarists Elmore Davis and Arthur "Big Boy" Crudup. He then worked as a gravedigger in Washington County.

Thomas was honored with a marker on the Mississippi Blues Trail in Leland, Mississippi.

Thomas died at the age of 66 in Greenville, Mississippi, from emphysema and a stroke on June 26, 1993. He is buried in Bogue Cemetery in Leland, and memorialized by a headstone placed in 1996 by the Mount Zion Memorial Fund and paid for by John Fogerty. His epitaph consists of lyrics from one of his songs. His son, Pat Thomas, died in 2025.

== Career ==
Thomas became known after appearing in films made by the Center for Southern Folklore in the 1970s. He appeared in the films Delta Blues Singer: James "Sonny Ford" Thomas, Give My Poor Heart Ease: Mississippi Delta Bluesmen, and Mississippi Delta Blues. In the 1970s, Eddie Cusic performed with Thomas at regular engagements. Together they recorded "Once I Had a Car", which is included on the compilation album Mississippi Delta & South Tennessee Blues (1977). In the 1980s, Thomas recorded internationally.

While working as a gravedigger, he was also a folk artist, making sculptures from unfired clay, which he dug out of the banks of the Yazoo River. His most famous sculpted images were skulls (often featuring actual human teeth), which mirrored his job as a gravedigger and his often stated philosophy that "we all end up in the clay". In 1985, his work was featured in the Corcoran Gallery of Art in Washington, D.C., where he was introduced to Nancy Reagan, then the First Lady. Thomas's skulls are on display in the Delta Blues Museum, in Clarksdale, Mississippi, and the Highway 61 Blues Museum, in Leland, Mississippi. Thomas played at numerous blues festivals and private parties throughout the area, including the Mississippi Delta Blues and Heritage Festival in Greenville.

In later performances, Thomas was accompanied by the Swiss harmonica player Walter Liniger. Thomas was recorded by several small record labels and is probably best known for his album Gateway to the Delta, recorded by Rust College in Holly Springs, Mississippi. The film based on his life, Gateway to the Delta: Delta Blues Singer James (Sonny Ford) Thomas, won the Mississippi Arts film festival award in 1972.

== Discography ==
- The Blues Are Alive and Well (1969), anthology
- Mississippi Delta & South Tennessee Blues (1979), Italian anthology (LP only)
- I Got the Blues This Morning (1979), Italian anthology (LP only)
- Highway 61 Blues 1968–82, LP edit, Center for Southern Folklore
- Gateway to the Delta 1986–87, LP edit, Center for Southern Folklore
- Son Down On The Delta, (1982), Flying High Records - FH 650, (LP)

== Selected exhibitions ==
Called To Create: Black Artists of the American South, National Gallery of Art, Washington, DC, September 18, 2022 – March 26, 2023, curated by Harry Cooper.

Black Folk Art in America, 1930-1980, Corcoran Gallery of Art, Washington, DC, January 15, 1982 - May 15, 1983, curated by Jane Livingston and John Beardsley.

Made by Hand: Mississippi Folk Art, Mississippi State Historical Museum, Jackson, Mississippi, January 22, 1980 - May 25, 1980.

== Sources ==
- Ferris, William (2009). Give My Poor Heart Ease: Voices of the Mississippi Blues. University of North Carolina Press. ISBN 0-8078-3325-8 (with CD and DVD with field recordings and video of Thomas)
- Nicholson, Robert (1999). Mississippi Blues Today! Da Capo Press. ISBN 0-306-80883-8.
