= Alexandria Museum of Art =

- Rapides Bank and Trust Company Building
- U.S. National Register of Historic Places
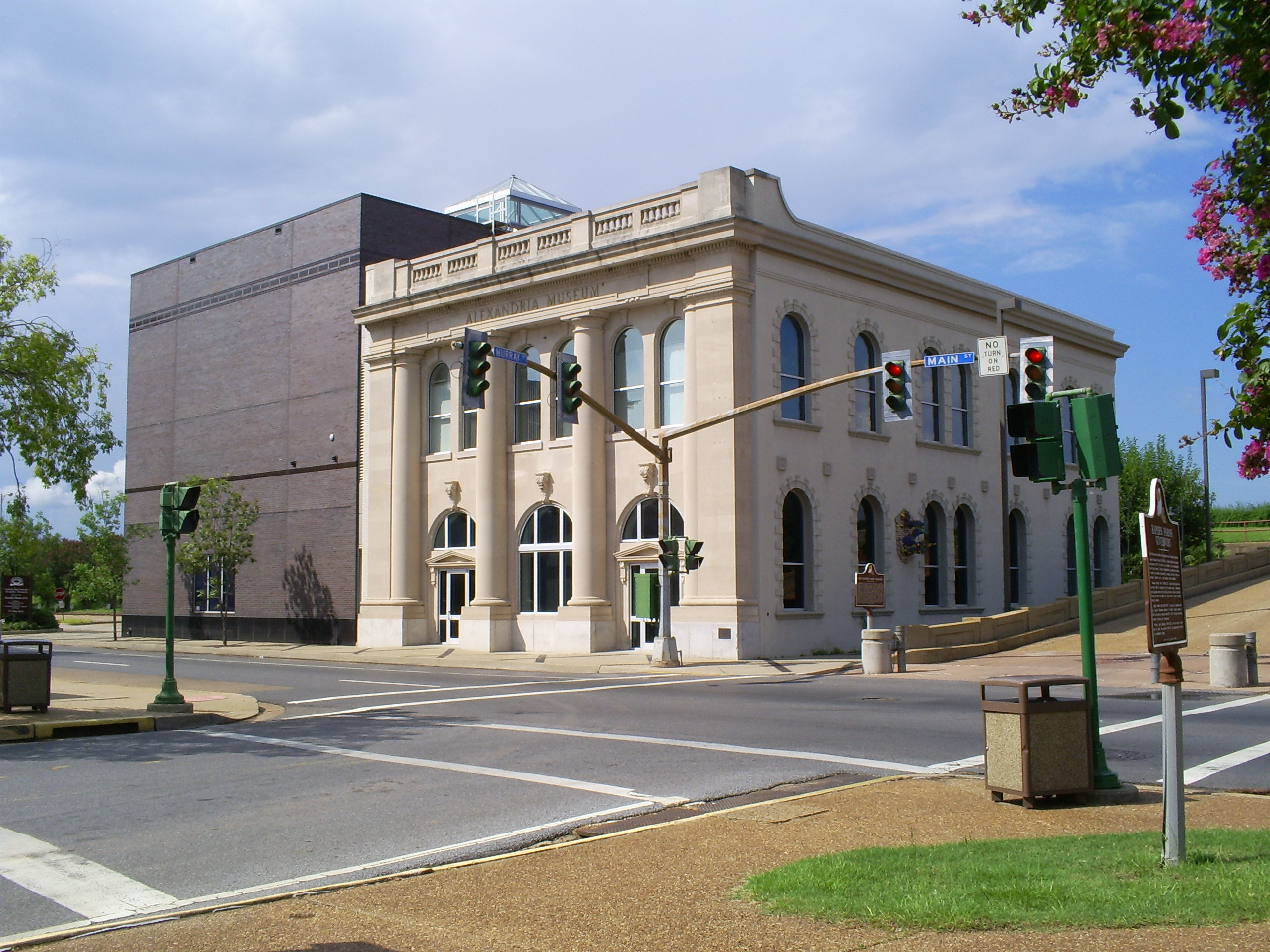
- Front and side of the building

- Location within Louisiana Location within the United States
- Location: 933 Main St., Alexandria, Louisiana
- Coordinates: 31°18′43″N 92°26′39″W
- Area: 0.2 acres (0.081 ha)
- Built: 1898
- Architectural style: Renaissance Revival
- Website: themuseum.org
- NRHP reference No.: 80001752
- Added to NRHP: May 15, 1980

The Alexandria Museum of Art (AMoA) of Alexandria, central Louisiana, United States opened its doors in 1977 in downtown Alexandria in the historic Rapides Bank and Trust Company Building (circa 1898). Rapides Bank and Trust Company Building is a historic bank building completed in 1898 in the Renaissance Revival style, and was added to the National Register of Historic Places on May 15, 1980. In 1998, AMoA expanded and constructed its grand foyer and offices as an annex to the Rapides Bank Building. In 1999, AMoA was honored as an Outstanding Arts Organization in the Louisiana Governor's Arts Awards. In 2007, the Museum entered into a collaborative endeavor agreement with Louisiana State University of Alexandria (LSUA). Today, AMoA also serves as a downtown campus for LSUA classes and hosts multidisciplinary community events, including lectures, yoga classes, and other public programs that celebrate visual art, music, literature, poetry, and the performing arts.

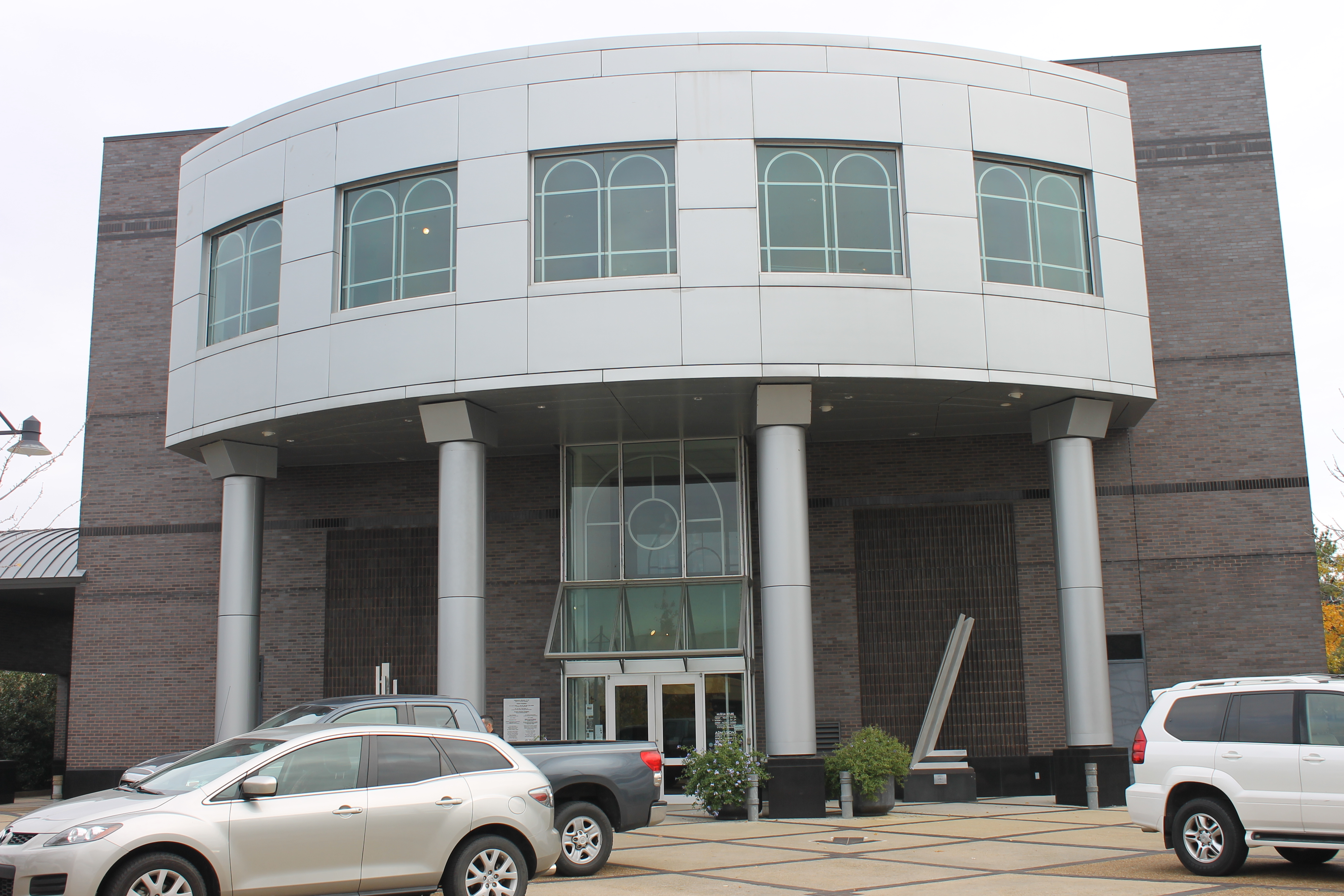
The Alexandria Museum of Art is located across from City Hall and the Hotel Bentley in downtown Alexandria, Louisiana.

The Alexandria Museum of Art is located across from City Hall and the Hotel Bentley in downtown Alexandria, Louisiana.

The museum presents between five and seven exhibitions each year, showcasing a wide range of contemporary art and rotating exhibitions from regional, national, and international artists.

AMoA offers educational programming and public events that complement its exhibitions through artist talks, lectures, workshops, and hands-on learning experiences for visitors of all ages. Signature programs include Art Together, a multigenerational art-making experience; artist-led workshops; the Muse Teen Club; Summer Art Camps; museum tours; Creative Round Table, a gathering for artists to discuss art and creative practice; Art and Mindfulness, a program serving military veterans; and three annual AMoA Illuminated Processions presented during downtown festivals.

The museum also partners with Louisiana State University of Alexandria through its Visual Thinking Strategies (VTS) program. Through this initiative, museum educators coach LSUA student teachers in the VTS method, an evidence-based approach that uses structured discussions about works of art, educational images, and text to strengthen students' critical thinking, communication, reading, and writing skills.

AMoA also offers youth educational programming through initiatives such as Art Elements, museum tours, and seasonal classes and workshops designed to foster creativity, visual literacy, and lifelong engagement with the arts.
