= Leland High School (Leland, Mississippi) =

Coordinates: 33°24′8″N 90°53′36″W

Location
- 404 East Third Street; Leland, Mississippi 38756; United States

Information
- Principal: Maurice Johnson
- Staff: 13.10 (FTE)
- Grades: 9-12
- Enrollment: 203 (2023–2024)
- Student to teacher ratio: 15.50
- Color
- Mascot: Cub
- Website: lelandhigh.ms.lsdh.schoolinsites.com

Leland Senior High School (LHS) is a public high school in Leland, Mississippi, United States. It educates approximately 336 students in grades nine through twelve. It is a part of the Leland School District. Leland Elementary and Leland School Park feed students into Leland High School. As of 2025, about 93 percent of students are black and 100 percent are documented as economically disadvantaged. Reading test and science test scores at the school were slightly above the state average and math scores at the state average.

== Post-segregation history ==
The school in 1982 graduated its first racially integrated school population from K–12, having implemented desegregation in 1970. Leland had a biracial group of parents and school administrators who had encouraged White families to remain in the public school system. By 1992 Leland High School was again majority black. By 1992, many children of White people who had graduated from the integrated Leland school system attended private schools in the Delta. By that time, the black community did not object to the de facto segregation that occurred.

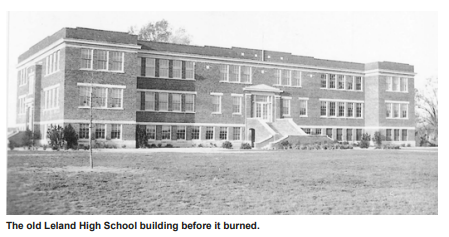
Newspaper clipping about the old Leland High School building before it burned in the 1920s

== Alumni ==
Graduates of Leland High School include former National Football League player Johnie Cooks and jurist Pamela Pepper (1982).
