= Margaret Evangeline =

American artist

- Born: 1943 (age 82–83); Baton Rouge, Louisiana, United States
- Education: University of New Orleans
- Known for: Sculpture, Painting
- Movement: post-minimalist, performance, and installation artist
- Website: Official website

Margaret Evangeline (born 1943 in Baton Rouge, Louisiana) is a post-minimalist painter, video, performance, and installation artist, noted for paintings riddled with bullet holes.

== Life ==
Evangeline was born in Baton Rouge, Louisiana, and lived in New Orleans before moving to New York City in 1992. Evangeline received her M.F.A. and B.A. from the University of New Orleans. She has had more than forty solo exhibitions in the United States and abroad. Evangeline received grants from the Pollock-Krasner Foundation, New York Foundation for the Arts, and the ART/OMI Foundation Artist in Residence.

== Works ==
Evangeline’s diverse practice includes large-scale site-specific installations using mirror-like surfaces. In these installations, viewers can find their reflections moving through bullet-marked environments of woods or water, with outcomes sometimes documented in Evangeline’s videos. The installations became linked with environmental art, as the bullet-riddled mirror polished stainless steel panels she is known for, began as a performance in either the woods, the New Mexico landscape, or the sky, which are mirrored in the context of the artwork. In New Orleans, she filled a cottage with fertile dirt from the Mississippi River, which sprouted new growth from seeds she planted.

As a process artist, her work began to evolve to include autobiographical elements, which distinguishes her work from other process art. Her career-spanning monograph was published by Charta in 2011. Including an essay by Edward Lucie-Smith and an interview by Dominique Nahas. It was reviewed in The Brooklyn Rail article 'Margaret Evangeline: Shooting Through the Looking Glass'

Sabachthani, a book of photographs, essays and poetry centered around a project Evangeline carried out in collaboration with her son's military unit in Iraq, was also published by Charta in November 2012.
