= Foote (disambiguation) =

Foote is a surname. It may also refer to:

- USS Foote, three vessels named after Rear Admiral Foote
- Foote Gower (1725/6–1780), English cleric, academic and antiquarian
- Foote, Mississippi, United States, an unincorporated community
- Fort Foote, an American Civil War fort defending Washington, DC
- Foote Islands, Antarctica

== See also ==
- Foote Dam, Michigan, United States
- Foote Field, a multi-purpose sports facility on the University of Alberta campus, Edmonton, Alberta, Canada
- Foot (disambiguation)
