= Foote =

Foote is an English surname. Notable people with the surname include:

== A ==
- Abram W. Foote (1862–1941), American politician from Vermont
- Adam Foote (born 1971), Canadian ice hockey player
- Albert E. Foote (1846–1895) American mineralogist
- Alexander Foote (1905–1956) British-born Soviet agent
- Andrew Hull Foote (1806–1863), American naval officer, a Union admiral
- Annie Foote (1887–1986), American politician
- Arthur Foote (1853–1937), American composer
- Arthur De Wint Foote (1849–1933), American engineer

== B ==
- Barry Foote (born 1952), American baseball player

== C ==
- Callan Foote (born 1998), Canadian ice hockey player
- Christopher Spencer Foote (1935–2005), American chemist

== D ==
- Diane Foote (born 1954), New Zealand Olympic gymnast

== E ==
- Edward Bliss Foote (1829–1906) American physicist
- Elisha Foote (1809–1883), American judge, inventor, and mathematician
- Elizabeth Erny Foote (born 1953), Judge of the United States District Court for the Western District of Louisiana since 2010
- Eunice Newton Foote (1819–1888), American scientist, inventor and feminist

== F ==
- Francis Onslow Barrington Foote (1850–1911), British army officer and musician

== G ==
- George William Foote (1850–1915), English radical journalist and secularist
- Georgia May Foote (born 1991), English actress and model

== H ==
- Henry Bowreman Foote (1904–1993), British recipient of the Victoria Cross, Director of the Royal Armoured Corps
- Henry S. Foote (1804–1880), US Senator and Governor of Mississippi (1852–1854)
- Hezekiah William Foote (1813–1899), American Confederate veteran, attorney, planter and state politician from Mississippi
- Huger Lee Foote (1854–1915), American planter and politician from Mississippi
- Horton Foote (1916–2009), American author and playwright

== J ==
- James Foote (1829–1895), Australian politician
- Jeff Foote (born 1987), American professional basketball player
- John Clarke Foote (1822–1895), Australian politician
- John J. Foote (1816–1905), American politician from New York
- Reverend John Weir Foote (1904–1988), Canadian recipient of the Victoria Cross during the Second World War
- Jonathan L. Foote (1935–2026), American architect
- Judy Foote (born 1952), Canadian politician and 14th Lieutenant Governor of Newfoundland and Labrador

== K ==
- Kenneth Foote (born 1948), American engineer

== L ==
- Larry Foote (born 1980), American football player
- L.B. Foote (1873–1957) Canadian photographer
- Lucinda Foote (1770/71–?), American teen who attempted to enroll at Yale College, but was rejected for her gender

== M ==
- Margie Foote (1929–2012), American politician from Nevada
- Mary Foote (1872–1968), American painter; Carl Jung associate
- Mary Hallock Foote (1847–1938), American writer and illustrator
- Mike Foote (fl. 2010s–2020s), American politician from Colorado

== N ==
- Nathaniel Foote (1592–1644), founder of Wethersfield, Connecticut

== P ==
- Percy Wright Foote (1879–1961), American naval officer

== R ==
- Richard H. Foote (1918–2002), American entomologist
- Robert Bruce Foote (1834–1912), British geologist who is considered the "Father of Indian Prehistory"

== S ==
- Samuel Foote (1720–1777), Cornish dramatist and actor
- Selina Foote, (born 1985), New Zealand visual artist
- Shelby Foote (1916–2005), American historian

== T ==
- Thomas Foote (1598–1687), English grocer and baronet
- Thomas M. Foote (1808–1858), American diplomat

== W ==
- William Henry Foote (1794–1869), American Presbyterian minister in the Antebellum South
