= Senator Foot =

Senator Foot or Foote may refer to:

== Members of the United States Senate ==
- Samuel A. Foot (1780–1846), U.S. Senator from Connecticut from 1827 to 1833
- Solomon Foot (1802–1866), U.S. Senator from Vermont from 1851 to 1866
- Henry S. Foote (1804–1880), U.S. Senator from Mississippi from 1847 to 1852

== United States state senate members ==
- Ezra Foot (1809–1885), Wisconsin State Senate
- John Alfred Foot (1803–1891), Ohio State Senate
- Abram W. Foote (1862–1941), Vermont State Senate
- Hezekiah William Foote (1813–1899), Mississippi State Senate
- Huger Lee Foote (1854–1915), Mississippi State Senate
- John J. Foote (1816–1905), New York State Senate
- Margie Foote (1929–2012), Nevada State Senate
- Mike Foote (fl. 2010s), Colorado State Senate
