= Ward Hall (Georgetown, Kentucky) =

Historic house in Kentucky, United States

- Ward Hall (Boundary Increase)
- U.S. National Register of Historic Places
- U.S. Historic district
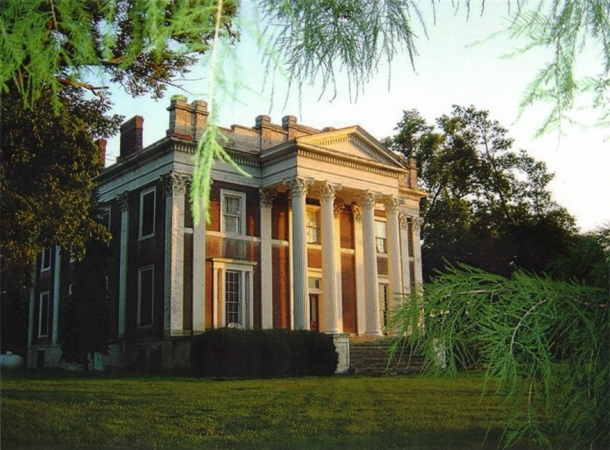

- Location within Kentucky Location within the United States
- Nearest city: Georgetown, Kentucky
- Coordinates: 38°12′23″N 84°35′18″W
- Built: 1853
- Architect: Lewinski, Thomas
- Architectural style: Antebellum Greek Revival
- NRHP reference No.: 85001841
- Added to NRHP: August 23, 1985

Ward Hall is a Greek Revival antebellum plantation mansion located in Georgetown, Kentucky. The main house covers 12,000 square feet (1,100 m^{2}), with 27-foot (8.2 m) high Corinthian fluted columns.

== History ==
The mansion was built for planter Junius Richard Ward (1802–1883) and his wife Matilda (Viley) Ward circa 1857 on their 500-acre plantation in Scott County, Kentucky, in the Bluegrass Region. Matilda Viley was the sister of Capt. Willa Viley, a pioneer thoroughbred breeder of Scott County. He was first president of the Lexington Racing Association.

Junius Ward was a grandson of the Col. Robert and Jemima (Suggett) Johnson family of Scott County, Kentucky. This was an extraordinarily powerful political and economic family dynasty, whose members extended their influence by developing cotton plantations throughout the Mississippi Delta. Like Ward, many members had plantations in Washington County along the Mississippi River near Greenville, Mississippi. One of Ward's cousins, Lycurgus Johnson, owned Lakeport Plantation on the other side of the river near Lake Village, Arkansas. Many of these family members had plantation houses in the deep South and summer residences and plantations in Scott County, Kentucky.

The Wards had this Scott County mansion built as a summer residence. Their Kentucky plantation cultivated tobacco and hemp, and raised award-winning livestock, including racehorses. The Wards also owned a large cotton plantation near Leota Landing, Washington County, Mississippi, where they wintered. Their plantation house in Mississippi served as their winter residence.

Due to financial reverses following the Civil War, Junius Ward declared bankruptcy; he was forced to sell the Scott County plantation in 1869. Nearby planters bought the property in two lots. A later owner offered the property with the mansion to the Commonwealth of Kentucky, with the condition that it be used as the state capitol. The state declined.

=== Design ===
The mansion design is attributed to Major Thomas Lewinski. It is the embodiment of numerous Minard Lafever design elements from his 1829 and 1835 pattern books. It was built by Taylor Buffington, with the assistance of James Bailey, a free man of color.

It measures 62 ft wide (19 m) and 69 ft long (21 m), four stories, with a 14-foot-wide (4.3 m), 65-foot-long (20 m) central corridor on three floors. There are three rooms on each side of the central corridor, with the exception of the area set aside for the nautilus-chambered double elliptical staircase which rises three floors.

The floor plan is based on #17/18 of the 20 permutations within the Palladian grammar by Andrea Palladio, an influential 16th-century Italian architect. At each end of the central corridor on the main floor are front and rear entrances with cut-glass transom and side lights. The domestic servants' cooking area and sleeping rooms in the basement represent one of the most intact antebellum basements in the country. In that period, the servants were enslaved African Americans. Slaves also served as laborers and artisans on the plantation: working with livestock and in the fields.

The original plantation had 500 acres. In its prime, it had "several brick dwellings for slaves and farm managers, a brick greenhouse, at least one and possibly more brick horse barns, a carriage house, a double brick outhouse, a carbide pump house, and a large tobacco barn."

The property was divided in 1869 and sold in two large lots. Another piece was later sold at the turn of the 20th century, but the mansion and 150 acres had been intact since 1904. When the complex was nominated in 1985, it consisted of this 150 acres. Some seventy-seven acres was considered in the nomination, as it contained the mansion and major part of outbuildings associated with the historic complex. Also on the property were later additions such as a Victorian horse barn and 1930s garage.

In the 21st century, the plantation complex of the mansion and related buildings is sited on forty acres. The complex is recognized as a historic district on the National Register of Historic Places.

== Preservation ==
Ward Hall now serves as the headquarters of The Ward Hall Preservation Foundation, Inc. The foundation raised one million dollars to purchase the 40 acres (160,000 m^{2}) estate.

Ward Hall is a Kentucky Landmark and the full complex is listed as a historic district on the National Register of Historic Places.
