= Lycurgus Johnson =

American planter and politician (1818–1876)

- Born: Lycurgus Leonidas Johnson; March 22, 1818; Scott County, Kentucky
- Died: August 1, 1876 (aged 58); Wilmington, Delaware
- Occupations: Planter, politician
- Spouse: Lydia Taylor
- Children: 12
- Parent(s): Joel Johnson; Verlinda Offutt Johnson
- Relatives: Robert Johnson (paternal grandfather); Richard Mentor Johnson (uncle); Benjamin Johnson (uncle); Henry Johnson (uncle); Margaret Johnson Erwin Dudley (cousin); Robert Ward Johnson (cousin)

Lycurgus Johnson (March 22, 1818 – August 1, 1876) was an American cotton planter and large slaveholder in the Arkansas Delta during the antebellum years. Born to the powerful political and planter Johnson family in Scott County, Kentucky, he became the owner and developer of the Lakeport Plantation in Chicot County, Arkansas. It bordered the west bank of the Mississippi River.

Although Johnson declared bankruptcy after the Civil War, he retained his land. After clearing his debts, he re-established his fortune. By 1870 he was the largest cotton producer in Chicot County. In 1874 he was elected to and served as a Democrat in the Arkansas House of Representatives.

== Early life ==
Lycurgus Johnson was born on Easter Sunday, March 22, 1818, in Scott County, Kentucky, to Joel Johnson and Verlinda (Offut) Johnson. His father Joel Johnson was also from Scott County and part of a powerful and influential family there. Like many other planters, his father acquired property in the Deep South, in his case, along the shores of Lake Chicot in the Arkansas Delta. Lycurgus had eight siblings.

Lycurgus's paternal grandfather, Robert Johnson, was a surveyor in Kentucky, which had put him in a good position to identify property to claim under land grants. Other influential relatives included paternal uncle Richard Mentor Johnson, who served as the ninth Vice President of the United States under President Martin Van Buren from 1837 to 1841. Another uncle, Benjamin Johnson, was appointed as a United States federal judge in Arkansas. Yet another paternal uncle, Henry Johnson, became a large landowner and slaveholder in Mississippi. Henry's daughter and Johnson's cousin, Margaret Johnson Erwin Dudley, became the owner of the Mount Holly plantation on Lake Washington in Mississippi.

== Early land acquisition and marriage ==
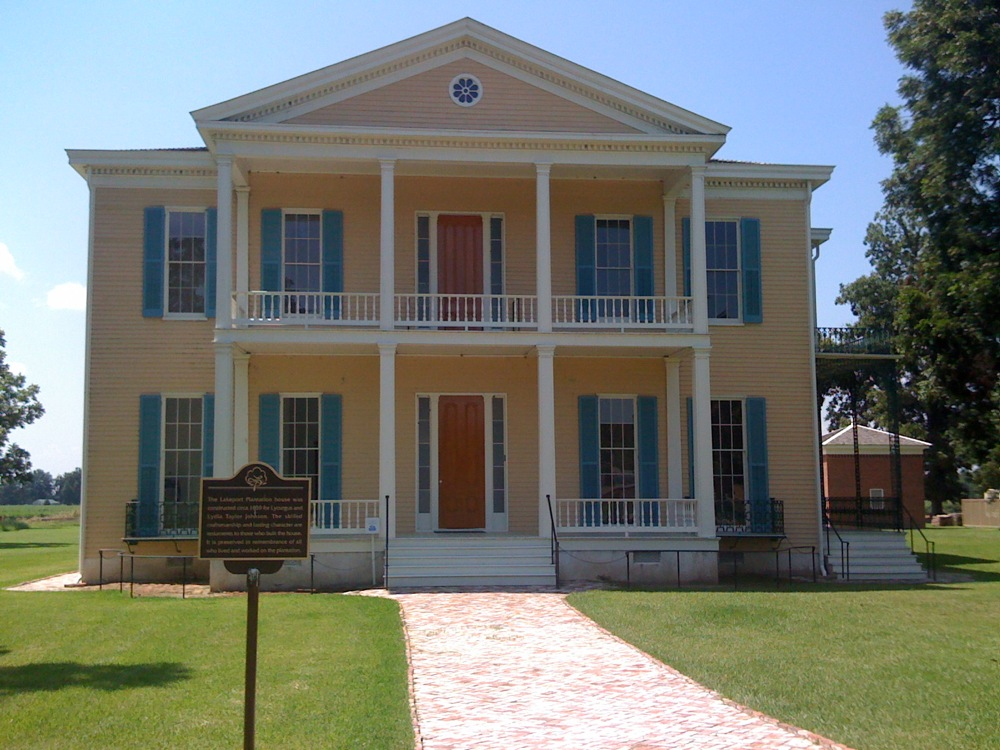
Lakeport Plantation.

Johnson acquired land in Chicot County, Arkansas for agricultural development in the mid-1830s, intending to develop it for cotton. He was part of a wave of migration by planters to the Deep South, following Indian Removal and opening of lands for European-American acquisition. They brought with them, or purchased through the domestic slave trade a total of nearly one million enslaved African Americans, resulting in dramatic demographic changes in the territory.

As part of getting established in adult life, Johnson married Lydia Taylor on January 12, 1842. They had a total of twelve children, but only six survived to adulthood. One of his daughters, Mary, married Isaac Worthington, from a planter family with property in Washington County, Mississippi.

== A major planter ==
In 1857, Johnson finally gained title to his father's plantation, known as Lakeport. He commissioned construction of a big house in 1859. Together with his original landholdings, by 1860 he owned 4,000 acres in the Arkansas Delta. The big house and five acres have been preserved as Lakeport Plantation, which was listed on the National Register of Historic Places. It is operated as a house museum and site for interpretation of Arkansas Delta history.

Johnson was a large slaveholder, by 1860 owning 155 African slaves to work his thousands of acres. He also owned "thirty horses, fifty-five asses and mules, sixteen milk cows, thirty working oxen, thirty-five other cattle, forty sheep, and sixty swine."

Johnson grew chiefly cotton and corn as commodity crops. By 1860, his harvest was 1,300 bales of cotton and 10,000 bushels of corn. Additionally, it included "two hundred bushels of sweet potatoes and five hundred pounds of butter." All of the harvest and food products were produced by slaves.

Johnson built a mansion on the Lakeport plantation. He owned seven or eight house servants. He also hired a tutor to privately educate his children. The mansion still stands today, and it has been listed on the National Register of Historic Places since November 20, 1974.

During the American Civil War of 1861–1865, Johnson lost most of his slaves as well as many valuables. The slaves left after the Emancipation Proclamation, or escaped before that to join Union lines. It is estimated that he lost in total up to several hundred thousand dollars in property. During the war, he held fundraisers for the Confederate States Army at Lakeport Plantation, some of which were attended by the Worthington planter family.

By the end of the war, Johnson still retained ownership of his land. In 1867, he filed for bankruptcy, and was able to waive his debts. He hired many former slaves, now freedmen, in the free labor market. He paid wages to some and offered others a share of the crop they picked, as sharecroppers. The freedmen generally no longer agreed to work for wages in large gangs. By 1870 Johnson succeeded in being the largest producer of cotton in Chicot County.

In 1874 Johnson was elected as a Democratic member of the Arkansas House of Representatives. He served on the Committee on Agriculture and the Committee on Cities and Towns.

Johnson died on August 1, 1876, in Wilmington, Delaware.
