= Henry Foote =

Henry Foote may refer to:

- Henry S. Foote (1804–1880), American senator and governor of Mississippi
- Henry Hezekiah William Foote (1813–1899), American Confederate colonel and state politician from Mississippi
- Henry Bowreman Foote (1904–1993), British major general and VC recipient

== See also ==
- Henry Foot (1805–1857), English-born cricketer in Australia
- Foote (surname)
