= Margaret Johnson Erwin Dudley =

American enslaver and letter writer (1821–1863)

- Born: March 4, 1821
- Died: August 28, 1863 (aged 42)
- Resting place: Lexington Cemetery
- Occupations: Planter, writer
- Spouses: James Erwin; Charles William Dudley
- Children: Charles Wilkins Dudley Jr.
- Parent(s): Henry Johnson; Elizabeth Julia Flournoy
- Relatives: Richard Mentor Johnson (paternal uncle); John Patton Erwin (brother-in-law, first marriage); Benjamin Winslow Dudley (father-in-law, second marriage)

Margaret Johnson Erwin Dudley (1821-1863) was a Southern belle, planter and letter writer in the Antebellum South. The owner of Mount Holly from 1854 to 1863, she was one of the largest slaveholders in Mississippi. She freed her slaves in 1858, prior to the beginning of the American Civil War.

== Early life ==
Margaret Johnson was born on March 4, 1821. Her father, Captain Henry Johnson, was a large landowner and slaveholder in Washington County, Mississippi. Her mother was Elizabeth Julia Flournoy.

Her paternal grandfather, Robert Johnson, was a Kentucky pioneer and surveyor. One of her paternal uncle, Richard Mentor Johnson, served as the ninth Vice President of the United States from 1837 to 1841, under President Martin Van Buren.

Her maternal grandfather, Major Matthew Flournoy, served in the American Indian Wars.

Like many Southern belles, Margaret learned to speak French fluently and studied French culture. She disapproved of the French Revolution of 1848, which overthrew King Louis Philippe's July Monarchy and established the Second French Empire led by Emperor Napoleon III.

== Career ==
In 1854, Dudley acquired Mount Holly, a 1,699-acre Southern plantation on Lake Washington with outbuildings, livestock and 100 enslaved people, from her father. She paid US$100,000 for it. With 100 slaves, she became "among the top 1 per cent of all slaveholders in Mississippi" according to Civil War historian John Y. Simon. After she remarried in 1855, an Italianate mansion was erected on the land.

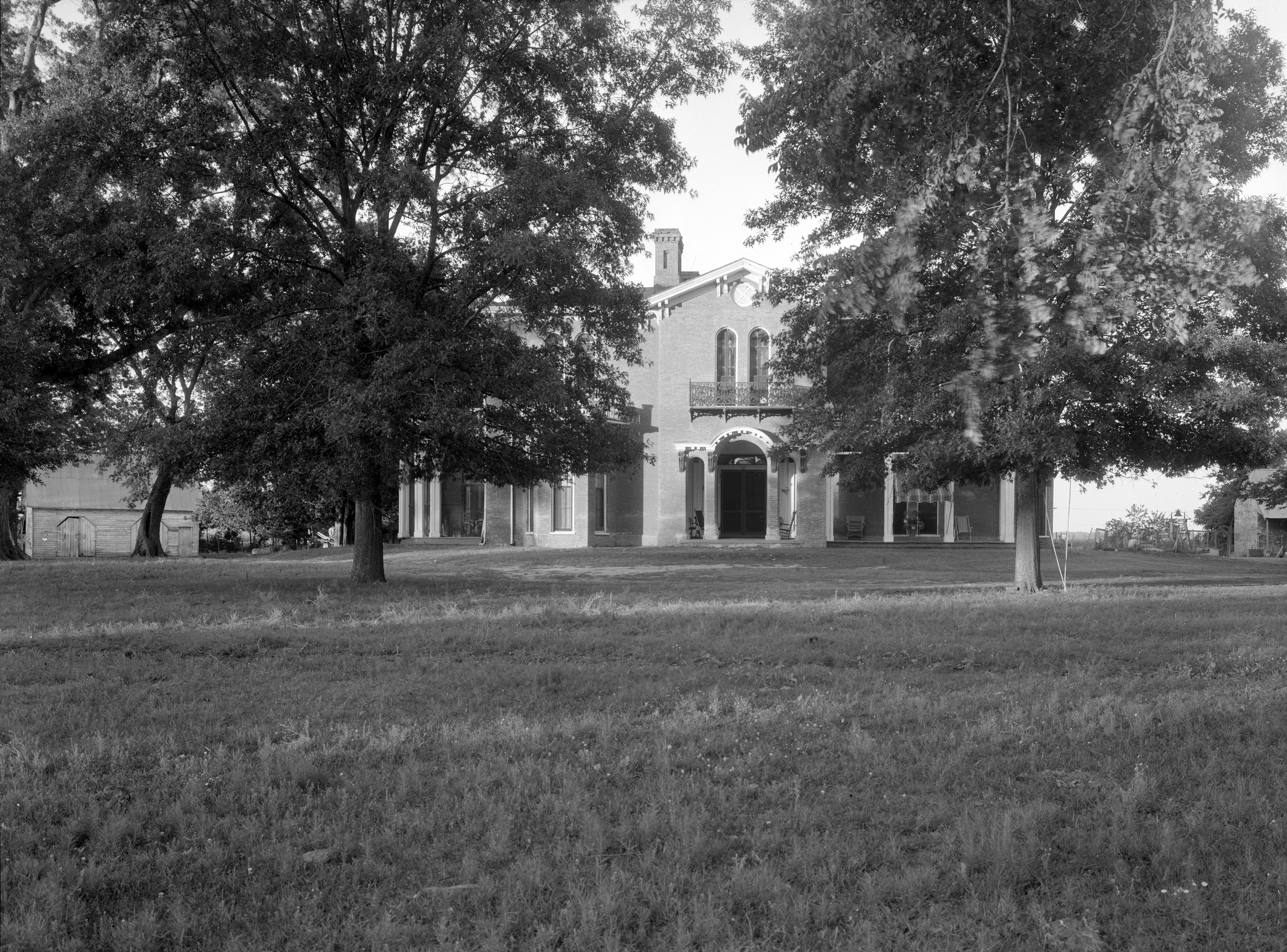
Mount Holly in 1937

Margaret was critical of the South, which she described as "stagnant." She was a "staunch supporter" of abolitionist politician Abraham Lincoln. She corresponded with Ellen Ewing Sherman, the wife of Union General William Tecumseh Sherman. She criticized Uncle Tom's Cabin by Harriet Beecher Stowe as "jejune, sentimental, and piffling". She freed her slaves in 1858, prior to the American Civil War.

She believed men and women ought to be on the same level. She was described by Civil War historian John R. Brumgardt as "an independent southern woman who disrespected convention." She often took trips to Europe with Caroline Wilson, a friend from Philadelphia.

== Personal life ==
She married James Erwin, the son of Colonel Andrew Erwin, a politician from Tennessee, in 1843. His former wife was Ann Brown Clay, the daughter of Henry Clay, and his brother, John Patton Erwin, was the editor-in-chief of the Nashville Whig newspaper and served as the mayor of Nashville, Tennessee from 1821 to 1822, and from 1834 to 1835. Moreover, his sister married Thomas Yeatman and later John Bell. They had a son, James William Erwin, who died as an infant, in 1851. Meanwhile, her husband died in 1851.

She remarried in 1855 to Dr Charles William Dudley, the son of Kentucky surgeon Benjamin Winslow Dudley. They lived at Mount Holly. They had a son, Charles Wilkins Dudley Jr., who died in 1911 in Cincinnati, Ohio.

== Death and legacy ==
Dudley died on August 28, 1863. She was forty-one years old. She was buried at the Lexington Cemetery in Lexington, Kentucky.

In 1981, Dudley's great-grandson John Seymour Irwin edited a collection of her letters entitled Like Some Green Laurel: Letters of Margaret Johnson Erwin, 1821-1863, published by the Louisiana State University Press. Irwin transcribed the letters in shorthand, then owned by collector A. S. W. Rosenbach. Their location is now unknown. The book is a biography, based on the letters but also on recollections from other descendants and documents about business and legal transactions he inherited. It contains many factual errors.

The Mount Holly mansion burned down on June 17, 2015.
