= John Foot =

John Foot or John Foote may refer to:

- John Foot, Baron Foot (1909–1999), English politician, member of the Foot family
- John Foot (historian) (born 1964), English academic, great-nephew of the above
- John Alfred Foot (1803–1891), American politician
- John Weir Foote (1904–1988), Canadian military chaplain
- John H. Foote (born 1959), Canadian film critic
- John J. Foote (1816–1905), American merchant and politician
