= Egremont, Mississippi =

Egremont
- Unincorporated community
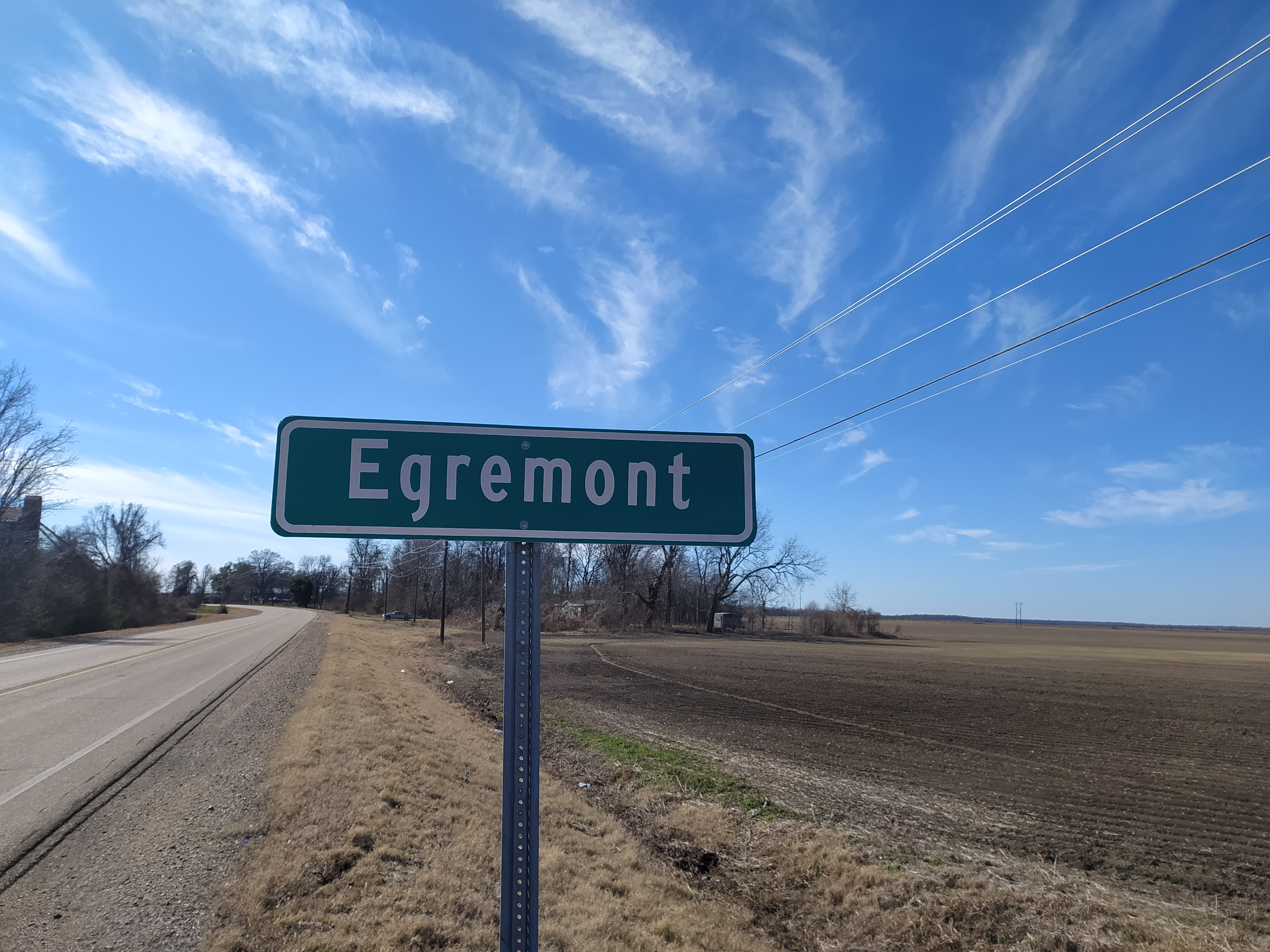
- Highway Sign in Egremont

- Location within Mississippi Location within the United States
- Coordinates: 32°51′38″N 90°54′12″W
- Country: United States
- State: Mississippi
- County: Sharkey
- Elevation: 108 ft (33 m)
- Time zone: UTC-6 (Central (CST))
  - Summer (DST): UTC-5 (CDT)
- GNIS feature ID: 669697

Egremont is an unincorporated community in Sharkey County, Mississippi, United States. A variant name for the community is "Baconia".

Egremont is located on U.S. Route 61, 4 miles (6.4 km) south of Rolling Fork.

== Gallery ==
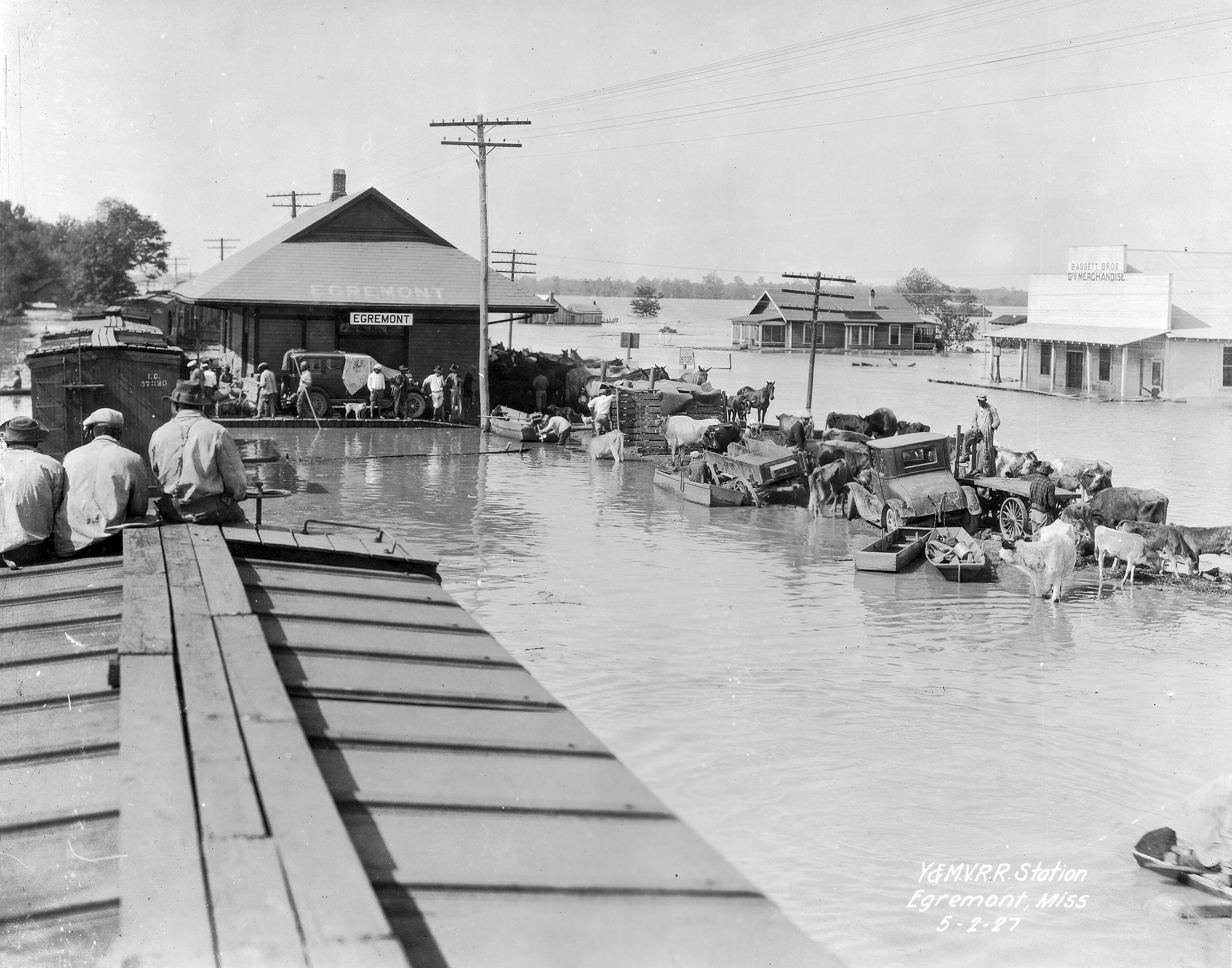
Yazoo and Mississippi Valley Railroad station in Egremont during the Great Mississippi Flood of 1927

== History ==
During the American Civil War of 1861–1865, a military campaign launched by Union forces was slowed by obstructions placed along Deer Creek at the Egremont Plantation.

In 1880, the Egremont Plantation became the property of Hezekiah William Foote. It was inherited by his son Huger Lee Foote, who was elected Sheriff of Sharkey County in 1890, and went on to serve in the Mississippi Legislature.

Egremont had a population of 40 in 1906.

In 1984, sculptor Wesley Bobo erected a steel dinosaur along Route 61 in Egremont.

A post office operated under the name Egremont from 1886 to 1954.
