= Chatham, Mississippi =

- Unincorporated community
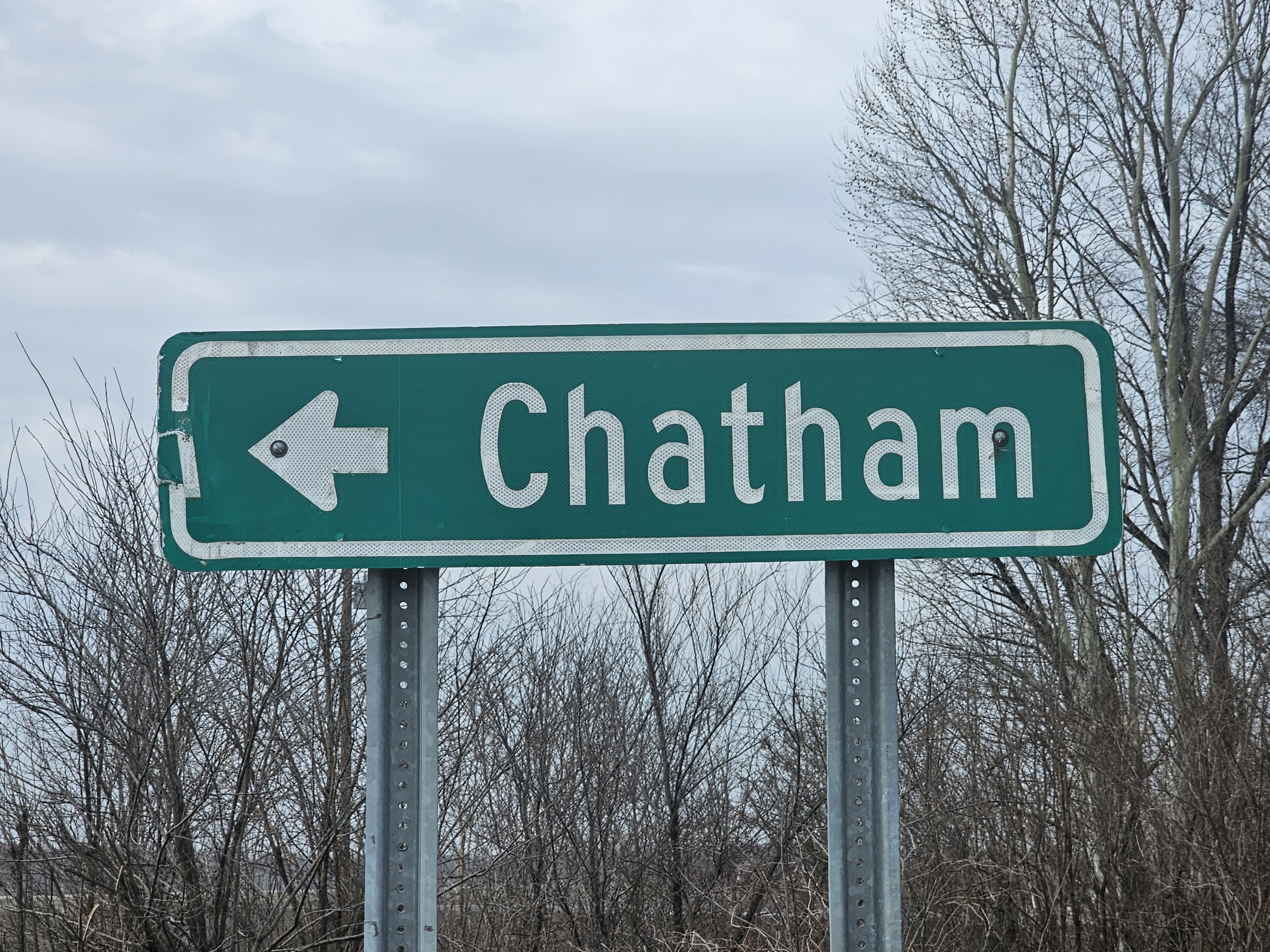
- Highway Sign outside of Chatham

- Location within Mississippi Location within the United States
- Coordinates: 33°06′02″N 91°05′52″W
- Country: United States
- State: Mississippi
- County: Washington
- Elevation: 115 ft (35 m)
- Time zone: UTC-6 (Central (CST))
  - Summer (DST): UTC-5 (CDT)
- ZIP code: 38731
- Area code: 662
- GNIS feature ID: 668356

Chatham is an unincorporated community located in Washington County, Mississippi, near the north shore of Lake Washington. Chatham is approximately 11 miles (18 km) south of Avon and approximately 9 miles (14 km) north of Glen Allan.

Although an unincorporated community, Chatham has a post office and a zip code of 38731.
