= Junius R. Ward House =

Historic house in Mississippi, United States

- U.S. National Register of Historic Places
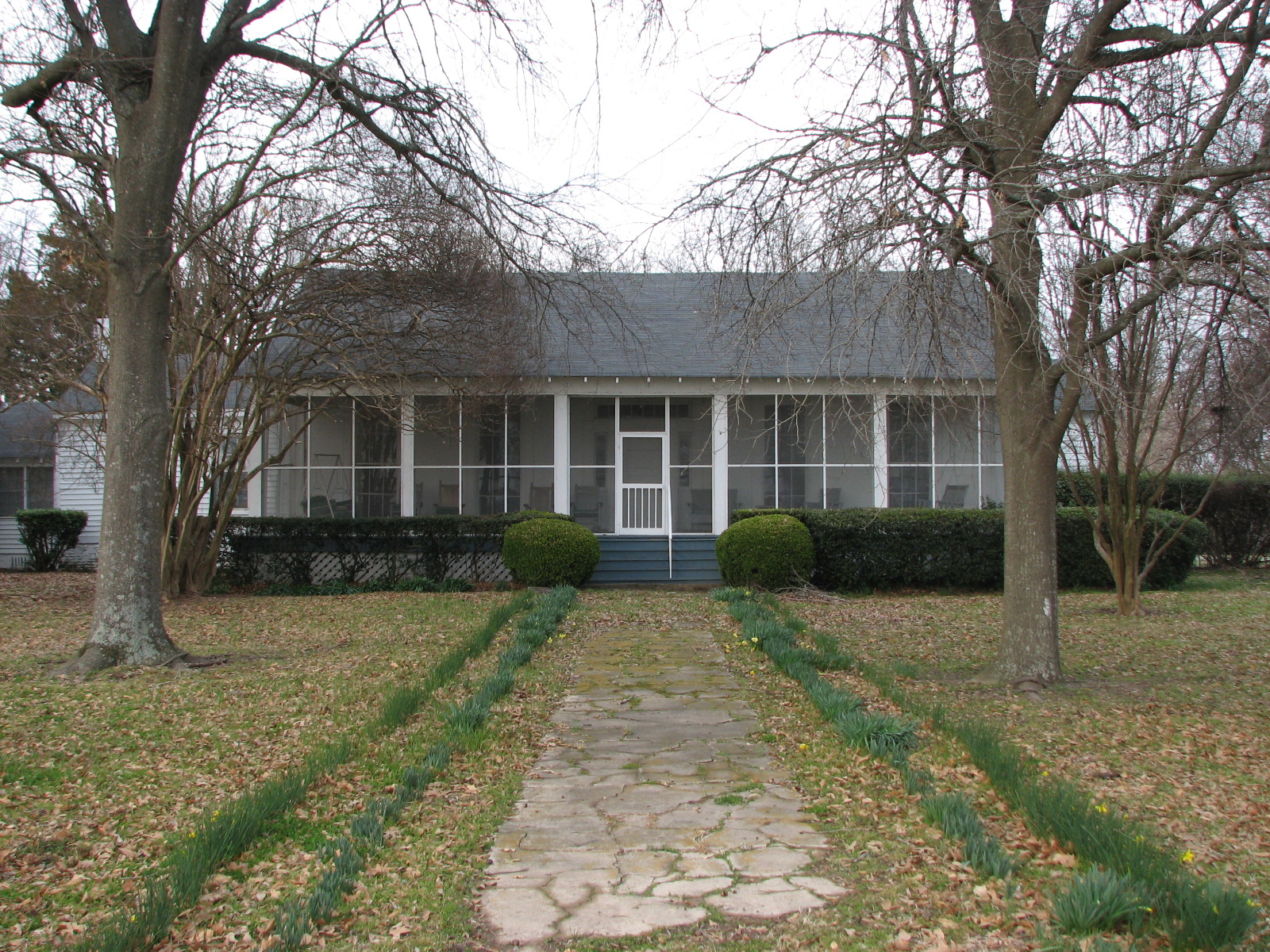
- The house in 2014

- Location within Mississippi Location within the United States
- Location: Old Hwy. 1, Erwin, Mississippi
- Coordinates: 33°6′13″N 91°2′50″W
- Area: 5 acres (2.0 ha)
- Built: 1830
- NRHP reference No.: 75001060

The Junius R. Ward House (a.k.a. Erwin House) is a historic house and former Southern plantation in Erwin, Mississippi.

== Location ==
It is located in Erwin, Washington County, Mississippi.

== History ==
The house was built on a plantation from 1827 to 1830, making it the oldest house still standing in Washington County, Mississippi. Prior to this house, a log cabin had been built at this location. The logs can still be seen in the attic. Thus, in 1830, Junius R. Ward, a planter from Kentucky who used the forced labor of enslaved people, built this house.

In 1877, the house was passed on to his daughter, Matilda Ward. She was married John Erwin, the original owner of Mount Holly in Foote, Mississippi. Painter George Caleb Bingham did a portrait of Maltilda Ward, which still hangs on a wall inside the house.

The house was inherited by their son, Victor Erwin, who lived there with his wife, Margaret Preston McNeilly, the daughter of Confederate veteran and newspaper publisher J. S. McNeilly. A loggia at the back of the house was added in 1910, as well as a rear cabinet in 1925. During that time, William Alexander Percy, the author of Lanterns on the Levee, was often invited to the house.

In 1940, it was inherited by their daughter, Margaret Erwin Shutt, who lived there with her husband, William Shutt. They restored the house.

== Heritage significance ==
It has been listed on the National Register of Historic Places since April 28, 1975.
