= Murder of William Butler =

1853 school shooting in Louisville, Kentucky

- Location: Louisville School; Louisville, Kentucky
- Date: November 2, 1853
- Attack type: School shooting
- Weapon: Pistol
- Victim: William Butler
- Perpetrator: Matthews Ward

The murder of William Butler was a school shooting that occurred in Louisville, Kentucky, in 1853. The perpetrator, Matthews Ward, shot his younger brother's schoolteacher, William Butler. Butler died from his injuries the day following the shooting. The shooting sparked outrage in Louisville, but Matthews Ward was ultimately acquitted.

In 2022, The Washington Post referred to the incident as the "first documented primary or secondary school shooting in the United States".

== Background ==
William Butler, a 28-year-old teacher from Indiana, founded the Louisville School, which attracted students from wealthy local families. Known for his strict discipline, Butler had served as a tutor to the Ward family for twenty months before traveling to Europe to enhance his language skills. He was married with children, and his right hand had been crippled by a burn, rendering him unable to close it or write with it. Butler was a member of the Unitarian church.

William Ward, the 15-year-old son of a prominent merchant and land speculator, attended the Louisville School. The Ward family was affluent, with Robert Sr. co-owning a successful New Orleans firm. Known for gambling, Robert Sr. had a riverboat named after him, and the family owned nine slaves. His wife was of Huguenot descent. Another of the Ward children was socialite Sallie Ward.

On November 1, 1853, Ward brought chestnuts into the classroom during a five-minute recess before Butler's French class, violating school rules. Ward distributed the chestnuts to other students, but denied eating any during class. After the lesson, Butler noticed chestnut shells and questioned the class about who had eaten them. Ward admitted bringing the chestnuts but insisted they were handed out before class. Butler punished one student for eating in class but excused another, who was new and unfamiliar with the rule. However, Butler accused Ward of eating during class, called him a liar, and administered a whipping, a common disciplinary action at the time. After the punishment, Ward took his hat and left the school. He informed his brother, Matthews, of the incident, as their parents were out of town that evening.

== Shooting ==
On November 2, 1853, Mr. and Mrs. Ward, along with Robert Ward Jr., returned around 9 a.m. Matthews informed his father of his intention to confront Butler at the school, and his father offered to accompany him. Robert Sr. later testified that Matthews was determined to compel Butler to make a proper apology in front of the school.

Earlier that morning, Matthews Ward had purchased a pair of pistols. His mother insisted that Robert Jr., known to carry a Bowie knife, accompany him, though she was unaware of the pistols. This precaution stemmed from a previous altercation with another teacher.

Around 9:30 a.m., a Ward family servant arrived at the school to collect textbooks and escort their fourth brother, Victor, home. By 10 a.m., Matthews and his brothers arrived at the school. Matthews, already enraged, greeted Butler with hostility, calling him a "damned scoundrel" and a "coward," which led to a physical altercation. During the struggle, Matthews drew his pistol and shot Butler. Robert Jr. brandished his knife, threatening the students and another teacher. The brothers fled, although Robert briefly returned to retrieve the murder weapon.

Students attempted to help Butler home, but he was too ill to be moved that far. They instead took him to a relative's house and called a doctor. Butler died early on November 3, 1853.

Following the incident, the sheriff arrested Matthews and Robert Jr. for Butler's murder. His death sparked outrage in Louisville. Butler was popular within the community, and the Wards were a wealthy family.

== Legal proceedings ==
The Wards' attorneys requested a change of venue from Jefferson County to Hardin County, citing biased coverage by Louisville newspapers. In February 1854, the brothers were transferred to the Hardin County jail, and the case received widespread media attention across the United States.

The trial began in April 1854. The prosecution was represented by four attorneys, while the defense included eighteen, among them John J. Crittenden. The jury selection process was contentious, with 64 men summoned before 12 were chosen. The judge instructed the jury to consider only manslaughter or acquittal for Matthews Ward, excluding murder as a charge. Robert Jr. was tried as an accomplice.

Matthews, who had arrived at court on crutches due to a rheumatic condition, did not use them at the time of the shooting. Prosecution witnesses included thirteen of the forty boys present during the incident. They testified that Matthews was not in danger from Butler and none saw Butler strike Matthews. They suggested that Butler might have raised his arm to deflect or push Matthews but agreed that Matthews kept his right hand in his coat pocket until he drew the pistol. One witness mentioned being prepared to intervene with tongs if necessary.

The defense sought to undermine the prosecution's witnesses. Crittenden alleged that Minard Sturgus, the other teacher, had influenced their testimonies. The defense argued that Robert Jr.'s account was the most credible, with Robert claiming that Butler had struck Matthews just before he shot. Character witnesses for the defense included James Guthrie, and a carpenter named Barlow testified that Butler had admitted to striking Matthews. However, the doctor who treated Butler disagreed with Barlow's account, while Barlow stated under cross-examination that he had not been paid by the Wards.

On April 26, 1854, both Matthews and Robert were acquitted. That evening, a crowd gathered outside the vacant Ward mansion. Some threw stones, breaking windows in the conservatory, and burned effigies of the brothers on the porch, which caught fire. The blaze was quickly extinguished, causing only minor damage.

=== Aftermath ===
The trial occurred during a period of shifting attitudes towards firearms in the United States. While many states outside of the South prohibited public carrying of guns, Kentucky had generally resisted such regulations, viewing them as infringements on the right to bear arms. The trial garnered more attention than the murder itself and faced widespread condemnation, especially from abolitionists and those outside the South. Critics decried the verdict, highlighting what they perceived as the South's violent nature and legal system, with one newspaper remarking, "An Act that would have hung him in Massachusetts is justified in Kentucky."
