= John Alfred Foot =

American politician (1803–1891)

Member of the Ohio State Senate
- In office 1853–1854

Member of the Connecticut General Assembly

Member of the Ohio House of Representatives
- In office 1837–1838

President of the Cleveland City Council
- In office 1839–1839

Personal details
- Born: November 22, 1803 New Haven, Connecticut, U.S.
- Died: July 16, 1891 (aged 87) Cleveland, Ohio, U.S.
- Party: Whig
- Spouse(s): Frances A. Hitchcock (m. 1826; d. 1855); Mary S. Hemperly Cutter (m. 1858; his death)
- Children: 7 (3 survived him)
- Parent(s): Samuel A. Foot (father); Eudocia Hull (mother)
- Relatives: Andrew Hull Foote (brother)
- Education: Yale College (1823)
- Profession: Lawyer, politician

John Alfred Foot (November 22, 1803 – July 16, 1891) was an American politician.

== Early life and education ==
Foot was born in New Haven, Connecticut, on November 22, 1803, and baptized in his mother's hometown, Cheshire, in 1804. He was the eldest child of Samuel A. Foot, a Senator of the United States and Governor of Connecticut, and his wife Eudocia, daughter of General Andrew Hull. His next younger brother was Admiral Andrew Hull Foote of the US Navy. His father removed to Cheshire about 1813. Foot graduated from Yale College in 1823, and, after studying law at the Litchfield Law School, he began to practice law in Cheshire in 1826.

== Career ==
Foot was twice elected to the Connecticut State Legislature by the Whigs, but in 1833 he removed to Cleveland, Ohio, where he formed a law partnership with Sherlock J. Andrews, which continued until 1848, when Andrews became a judge. In 1837, Foot was elected to the Ohio Legislature, but declined a re-nomination the next year. In 1839 and 1840 he was a member of the Cleveland City Council, serving in the former year as president of that body, and in 1853 he was elected to the Ohio State Senate.

In 1854 he retired from the practice of his profession, and his later years were largely devoted to the promotion of various public interests. He was in 1856 one of three commissioners selected by Governor Salmon P. Chase to consider the establishment of a State Reform School, and he served for nearly twenty years from the organization of the well-known Ohio Reform School as one of the Board of Commissioners. He was an elder of the First Presbyterian Church in Cleveland.

== Personal life ==
Foot was married, on October 6, 1826, to Frances A., daughter of Silas Hitchcock, of Cheshire, who died in 1855. In 1858 he was next married to Mary S. (Hemperly) Cutter, widow of Abilene D. Cutter, of Cleveland, who survived him. Of the seven children by his first marriage, one died in infancy, and two daughters and a son survived him. After a vigorous old age he was prostrated in April, 1891, by the grip, which developed into severe pneumonia. He recovered from the attack, but was not able to regain his strength, and after lingering for three months, died at his home in Cleveland, on July 16, at the age of 87.
