= Foote Islands =

The Foote Islands (66°12′S 66°12′W) are a small group of snow-capped islands and several rocks, lying 12 nautical miles (22 km) southeast of Cape Leblond, Lavoisier Island, in Crystal Sound. They were mapped from air photos obtained by the Ronne Antarctic Research Expedition (1947–48) and surveys by the Falkland Islands Dependencies Survey (FIDS) (1958–59). They were named by the UK Antarctic Place-Names Committee for Brian L.H. Foote, a FIDS radio mechanic at Arthur Harbour (1957) and a surveyor at Detaille Island (1958), who made surveys of the Crystal Sound area.

== See also ==
- List of Antarctic and sub-Antarctic islands
