= Erwin, Mississippi =

- Unincorporated community
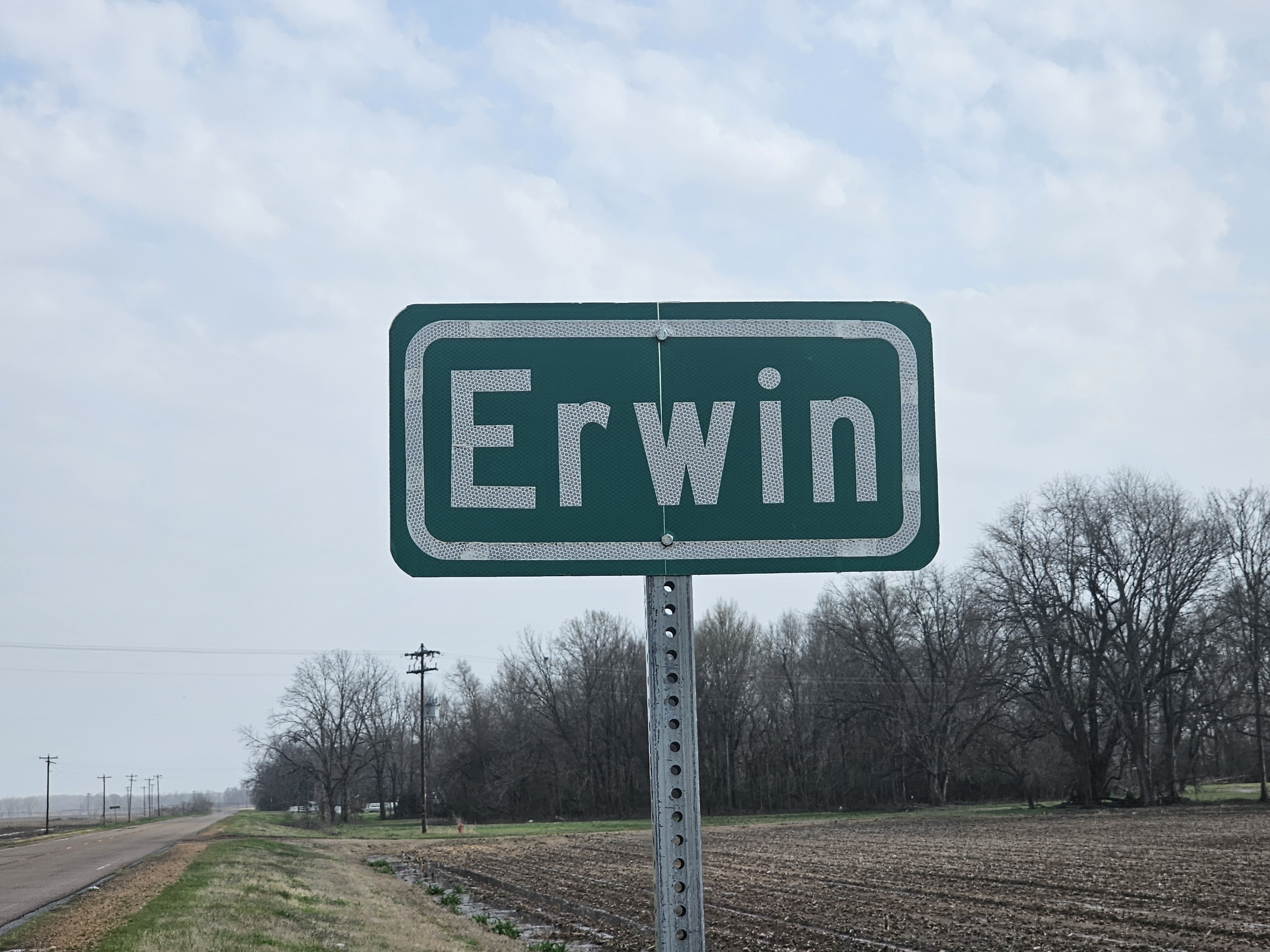
- Highway Sign in Erwin

- Location within Mississippi Location within the United States
- Coordinates: 33°06′14″N 91°02′37″W
- Country: United States
- State: Mississippi
- County: Washington
- Elevation: 115 ft (35 m)
- Time zone: UTC-6 (Central (CST))
  - Summer (DST): UTC-5 (CDT)
- ZIP code: 38731
- GNIS feature ID: 669804

Erwin is an unincorporated community in Washington County, Mississippi, United States.

It is located on the north shore of Lake Washington.

The Erwin House is located there, and dates back to 1830. It is the oldest extant structure in Washington County, and is listed on the National Register of Historic Places.

As part of a widespread Anti-Italianism, vigilante mobs attacked Italians in Mississippi, and in 1901, murders took place in Erwin.
