= Francis Onslow Barrington Foote =

British colonel and opera singer

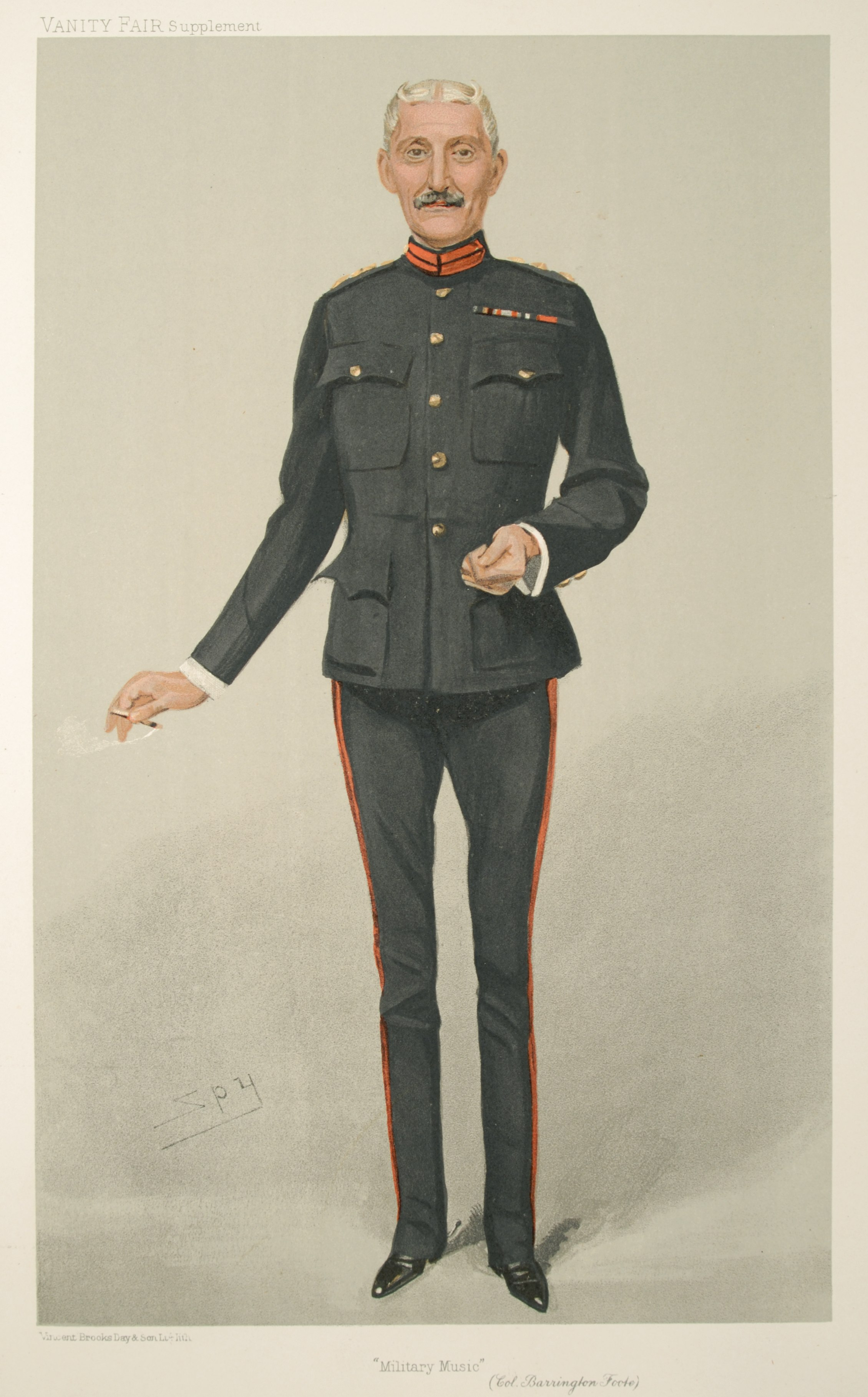
"Military Music". Caricature of Colonel Barrington Foote by Spy published in Vanity Fair in November 1905

Francis Onslow Barrington Foote (1850 – 26 February 1911) was a British colonel in the Royal Artillery, the Commandant of the Royal Military School of Music, and an opera singer in London.

== Early life ==
He was born Portsea Island, Q1, 1850, the son of General William Francis Foote and Dinah Jane (Nina) Foote (born Nicholls).

== Military career ==
After education at the Royal Military Academy Woolwich, Barrington Foote entered the Royal Artillery in 1869 and was promoted to captain in 1879, to major in 1885, to lieutenant-colonel in 1892, and to colonel in 1899. He served in Afghanistan and received a campaign medal in 1880. He was Deputy Assistant Adjutant and Quartermaster General at Alexandria in the Anglo-Egyptian War in 1882 and received despatches medal, 4th class Medjidie, Khedive's star. He was Aide-de-Camp to Lord Hobart, Governor of Madras, to the Marquess of Ripon, Governor-General of India, and to the Inspector-General, Royal Artillery.

Barring Foote was the President of the Royal Artillery Band Committee and was from 1900 to 1905 the Commandant of the Royal Military School of Music; his successor as Commandant was Sir Alfred Granville Balfour. Foote's predecessor as Commandant was Colonel Farquhar Glennie (1843–1922).

== Singing career ==
Francis O. Barrington Foote was a famous baritone singer and frequently sang with Adelina Patti at the Royal Opera House in Covent Garden. He sang the role of Hal o' the Chepe in Charles Stanford's 1883 opera The Canterbury Pilgrims and the role of Lucifer in Arthur Sullivan's cantata The Golden Legend.

== Family ==
In Q1, 1884 Barrington Foote was married in St. George's, Hanover Square to Agnes Mary Glyn, born St. George's, Hanover Square in Q1, 1863, daughter of Hon. Pascoe Charles Glyn and Horatia Louisa St. John-Mildmay. She died aged 91 in Worthing on 21 September 1954. They had three sons and a daughter.

- Alan Wortley Barrington Foote, b.1885; d. unmarried, Chertsey, Q2 1923
- Sibell Mary Baker (born Barrington Foote, Q1 1884 in Portsea) m. Clare V. Baker, Q1 1912, St. George's Hanover Square, d. Cirencester, Q4 1950 aged 64 - no children.
- Frederick Stanley (b. Portsea, Q4 1886)
- William Richard (b. Portsea, Q3 1888)

== Death ==
It appears that Barrington Foote fell into "reduced circumstances" before his death on 26 February 1911.
