= Jonathan L. Foote =

American architect (1935–2026)

Jonathan Lipe Foote (May 30, 1935 – May 22, 2026) was an American architect whose work is associated with the preservation movement in the United States. He was the founder of Jonathan L. Foote and Associates, Inc., an architecture firm based in Livingston, Montana.

== Life and career ==
Foote was born in London, England, on May 20, 1935, and was the second son of United States Colonel Ray Palmer Foote and Rosann Lipe Foote Smith. He is a direct descendant of Elizabeth Deming and Nathaniel Foote, who settled Wethersfield, Connecticut, in 1636.

He attended Phillips Academy and Yale University, where he received a Bachelor of Arts in 1958. In 1959 he attended the Rhode Island School of Design, and in 1964 he received a Bachelor of Architecture and a Master of Architecture from The Yale University School of Architecture.

Although the idea of historic preservation traces back at least to the 1920s, Foote is primarily linked to its greater urgency and wider acceptance following the demolition of New York City's Pennsylvania Station in 1964. He was an early proponent of historic renovation, regional design, and historic preservation for private and public works throughout rural and urban parts of New England during the 1960s. He is more broadly noted in the American Northwest for a large variety of projects that date back to the 1970s. He is recognized for innovative reuse of indigenous hand-hewn timbers and stone and sensitive siting of buildings in their natural environment. Together in 2006, Buck Brannaman and Jon Foote received honorary doctorate degrees from Montana State University, Foote for his contributions to the state in architecture and art. During a speech, Brannaman, who is the real-life "Horse Whisperer" and an inspiration for Redford's movie, publicly credited Foote "for supporting me when I was young, broke, and nobody cared who I was, and for doing it without motive or gain."

Foote was an adjunct professor of Architecture at the Yale School of Architecture in 1965 and 1966 and at Montana State University from 1979 to 1989. He is a member of the American Institute of Architects (AIA) and has been elected to the National Cutting Horse Association Hall of Fame.

He founded the architecture firm in 1979, Jonathan L. Foote and Associates, Inc. (JLF and Associates) based in Livingston, Montana. In 2000, he retired, selling the firm to senior associate Paul Bertelli, associates Logan Leachman and Dick Storbo, and CFO Tammy Hauer.

Foote died from complications of Parkinson's disease in Livingston, Montana, on May 22, 2026, at the age of 90.
