= Annie Foote =

American politician (1887–1986)

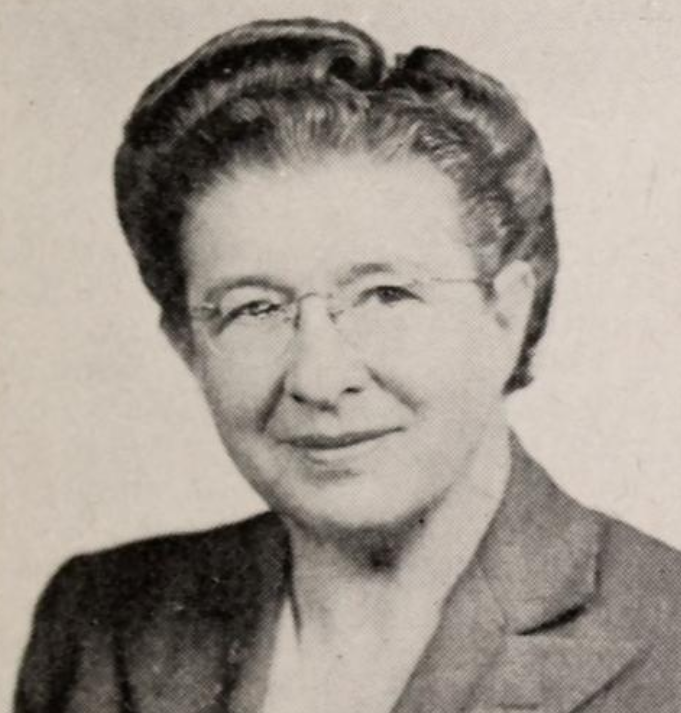
- Foote c. 1946

Member of the Connecticut House of Representatives from Hebron
- In office 1945–1947 Serving with Fitch N. Jones
- Preceded by: Elton W. Buell; Harold L. Gray
- Succeeded by: Fitch N. Jones; Edward M. Pomprowicz

Personal details
- Born: October 6, 1887 Hebron, Connecticut, U.S.
- Died: January 13, 1986 (aged 98) Manchester, Connecticut, U.S.
- Party: Republican
- Spouse: Robert E. Foote (m. 1913)
- Children: 4
- Education: Alfred University (B.A.)

Annie Hutchinson Foote (October 6, 1887 – January 13, 1986) was an American politician who served in the Connecticut House of Representatives from 1945 to 1947, representing the town of Hebron as a Republican.

== Personal life ==
Foote was born in Hebron, Connecticut, on October 6, 1887, to Alfred and Lovina Hutchinson. She graduated from Bacon Academy, a high school in Colchester, and later earned a bachelor's degree from Alfred University in Alfred, New York.

Foote lived in Gilead, a village in Hebron. She married Robert E. Foote in 1913, and they had four children. Robert served in the Connecticut House of Representatives from 1927 to 1931. They were married until Annie's death in 1986.

== Political career ==
Foote was elected to the Connecticut House of Representatives in 1944, and she served one term representing the town of Hebron alongside Fitch N. Jones. She was a member of the Education Committee and the Public Personnel Committee. Foote unsuccessfully ran for reelection in 1946 and left office in 1947.

== Death ==
Foote died on January 13, 1986, at Manchester Memorial Hospital in Manchester, Connecticut. She was 98.
