= Mount Holly (Foote, Mississippi) =

Historic house in Mississippi, United States

- U.S. National Register of Historic Places
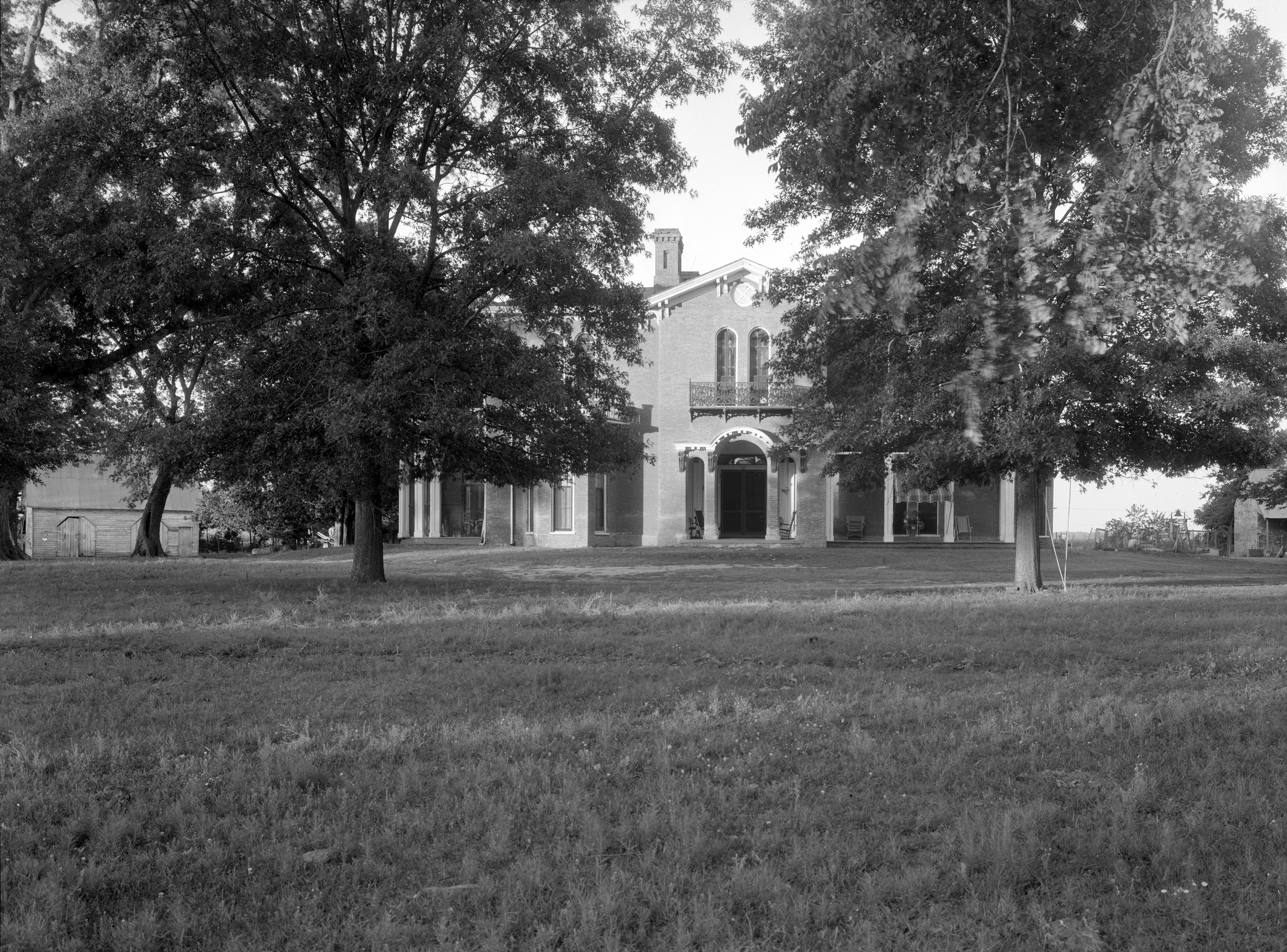
- The house in 1937

- Location within Mississippi Location within the United States
- Location: Foote, Mississippi
- Coordinates: 33°5′42″N 91°2′12″W
- Area: 7 acres (2.8 ha)
- Built: 1855
- Architectural style: Italianate
- NRHP reference No.: 73001030
- Added to NRHP: August 14, 1973

Mount Holly (a.k.a. Dudley Plantation) was a historic Southern plantation in Foote, Mississippi. Built in 1855, it was visited by many prominent guests, including Confederate President Jefferson Davis. It was later acquired by ancestors of famed Civil War novelist Shelby Foote, who wrote a novel about it. It burned down on June 17, 2015.

== Location ==
It is located in Foote, Washington County, Mississippi. It is situated on the Eastern shore of Lake Washington.

== History ==
The land was patented by John C. Miller in 1831. By 1833, he sold it to Henry Johnson and his wife, Elizabeth Julia Flournoy.

In 1854, their widowed daughter, Margaret Johnson Erwin Dudley, acquired 1,699 acres of land known as the Mount Holly Plantation for US$100,000. It came with outbuildings, livestock, and 100 enslaved laborers.

A year later, in 1855, she married Dr. Charles Wilkins Dudley, the son of Kentucky surgeon Benjamin Winslow Dudley. Charles commissioned the construction of the mansion as a present for his wife. Made of red bricks and built with the forced labor of enslaved people, it has two stories and thirty-two rooms. It was designed in the Italianate architectural style, either by architect Samuel Sloan or Calvert Vaux, after the Dudleys consulted with both architects.

The Dudleys entertained guests such as Confederate President Jefferson Davis, Albert Sidney Johnston, John C. Pemberton, Ulysses S. Grant, and William T. Sherman.

In the 1880s, it was purchased by Hezekiah William Foote, a wealthy planter, Confederate veteran, and member of the Mississippi House of Representatives and Mississippi Senate. It was later inherited by his son, Huger Lee Foote, a planter and member of the Mississippi Senate. His grandson was the author Shelby Foote, whose 1949 novel Tournament is based on his father's loss of the family home.

From 1903 to 1956, the mansion belonged to Mary Griffin Lee. In 1927, it was used as a relief shelter during the Great Mississippi Flood of 1927. It was later inherited by Lee's granddaughter. She turned into a bed and breakfast.

The plantation mansion burnt down on June 17, 2015. The ruins remain privately owned.

== Heritage significance ==
It has been listed on the National Register of Historic Places since August 14, 1973. The house contains a historical marker commissioned by the National Society of Colonial Dames on an outside wall which reads: "Mount Holly, Ca. 1856, Excellent example of Italianate style steeped in history of the Mississippi Delta, built for Margaret (Johnson) Erwin Dudley, an early settler's daughter, used as headquarters for relief committees in 1927 flood, marked by Mississippi State Society, National Society of Colonial Dames XVII Century, October 10, 1998."
