= USS Foote =

Three ships of the United States Navy have borne the name USS Foote, named in honor of Rear Admiral Andrew Hull Foote.

- USS Foote (TB-3), was the lead ship of Foote-class torpedo boat launched in 1896 and sold in 1920
- USS Foote (DD-169), was a Wickes-class destroyer, launched in 1918. In 1940 the ship was transferred to the United Kingdom and recommissioned as HMS Roxborough (I07). In 1944 she was transferred to the Soviet Union and recommissioned as Zhostkyi. She was returned to Great Britain in 1949 and scrapped in 1952
- USS Foote (DD-511), was a Fletcher-class destroyer, launched in 1942 and struck in 1972
