= Lakeport Plantation =

Plantation house in Arkansas, United States

- U.S. National Register of Historic Places
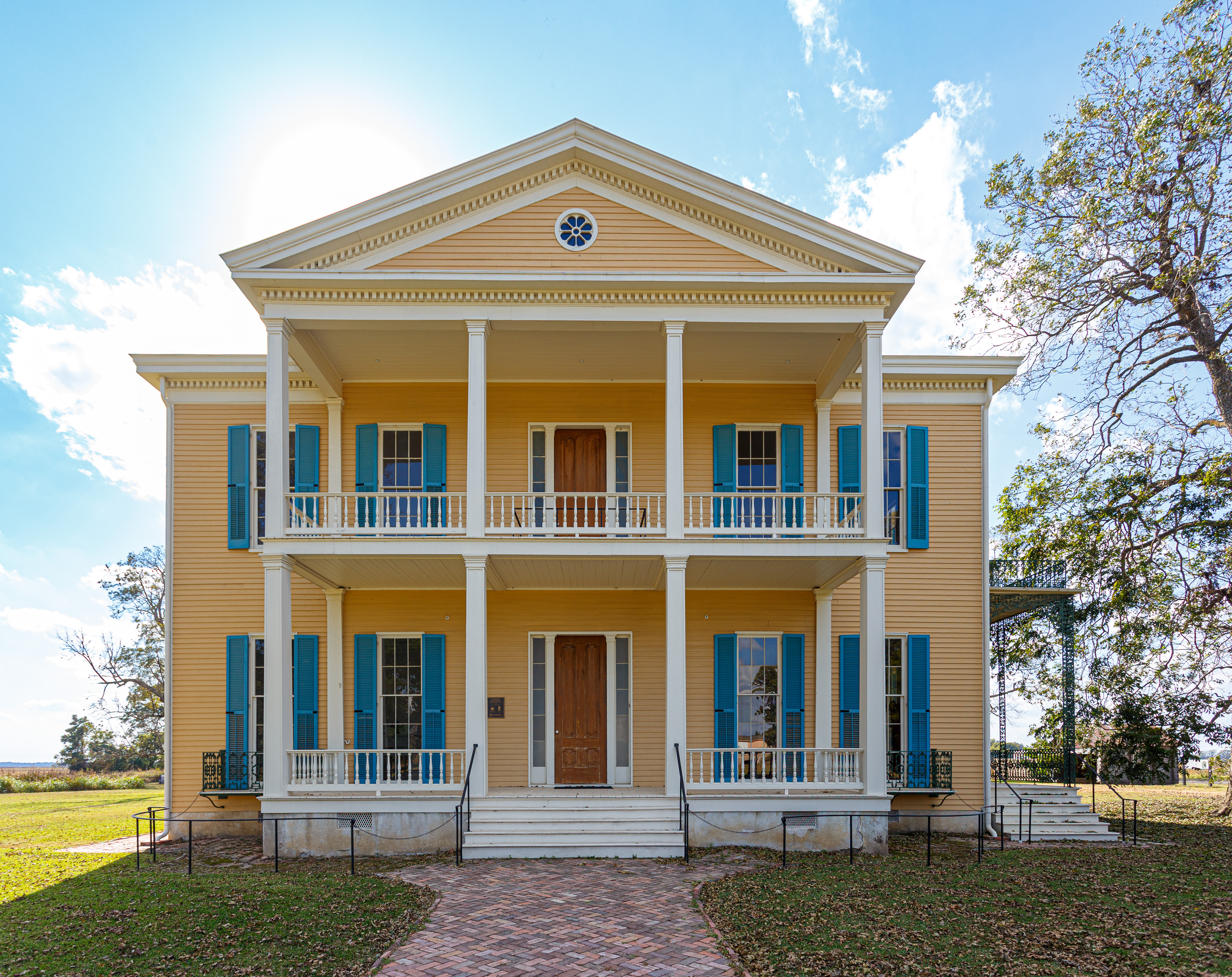
- Lakeport Plantation in 2022

- Location within Arkansas Location within the United States
- Nearest city: Shives, Arkansas
- Coordinates: 33°15′24″N 91°9′19″W
- Area: 5 acres (2.0 ha)
- Built: c. 1859
- Architectural style: Greek Revival
- NRHP reference No.: 74000466
- Added to NRHP: November 20, 1974

Lakeport Plantation is a historic antebellum plantation house located near Lake Village, Arkansas. It was built around 1859 by Lycurgus Johnson with the profits of slave labor. The house was restored between 2003 and 2008 and is now a part of Arkansas State University as a Heritage site museum.

== History ==
The plantation was established in 1831 by Joel Johnson, from a prominent planter family in Scott County, Kentucky. He arrived with 23 enslaved people and set up a slave labor camp to produce cotton, an endeavor that made him one of the wealthiest and most influential men in the state.

Joel Johnson died in 1846, leaving the plantation's ownership in legal dispute. In 1857, his son Lycurgus Johnson, a successful operator of his own slave labor camp, acquired the title to Lakeport. He also took over the enslavement of 88 people. By 1850, he had 2,850 acres of land and 95 slaves.

The plantation's mansion was built around 1859 in the Greek Revival architectural style. By 1860, owned more than 155 slaves, and forced them to work some 4,000 acres of land at Lakeport and his other Arkansas properties. Records show that most of the enslaved people were field hands, but some were masons, house-hold servants, and carpenters. Plantation life was exhausting for those forced to work it; many worked six days a week with only one day off, typically Sunday.

The plantation was highly profitable as cotton prices increased with European demand, though the Civil War took a toll on Johnson's fortunes. Confederate forces burned 158 bales of the plantation's cotton in 1862 to prevent its capture by Union forces.

Tax records show that by 1864 the number of people enslaved at Lakeport had declined to 24, as many former slaves fled after Abraham Lincoln signed the Emancipation Proclamation. The end of the Civil War resulted in the emancipation of the remaining enslaved people. While they obtained their freedom, they still held limited rights and faced continued discrimination and oppression in Arkansas. The Freedmen's Bureau was created to help freedmen, transitioning many into sharecropping and tenant farming. Lycurgus worked closely with the Bureau and negotiated wages for the no-longer-enslaved people to labor on his plantation and continue to grow cotton. Within a few years, many of the freedmen worked for Johnson either as paid laborers or as sharecroppers, as other jobs were few in the agricultural delta. He became well known in the county because he managed to continue to profit despite the war and subsequent flooding and economic depression. Lakeport was among the leading cotton producers in Chicot County in 1870.

The plantation went through several changes after Lycurgus Johnson died on August 1, 1876, as a result of complications from a gastrointestinal disorder. His wife Lydia owned it until she died in December 1898, when it passed to the youngest son, Victor Johnson. It remained in the Johnson family until 1927 when Victor sold it to the Sam Epstein family.

== Legacy ==
In 1974 the plantation was placed on the National Register of Historic Places. It was donated by the Sam Epstein Angel family to Arkansas State University in 2001.

Restoration of the plantation began in 2003 and finished in 2007. Some of the restored parts were the doors, floorcloth, mantel, rose window in the attic, and the smokehouse in the back of the property. In 2007, it opened as a public museum. The plantation house is surrounded by cotton fields that are harvested every year.

== Blake Wintory ==
Blake Wintory is a historian and author who served as the on-site director at the Lakeport Plantation from 2008-2018. He wrote a book on Chicot County (Chicot County (2015), Arcadia Publishing, part of the Images of America series) and has written about African American legislators in Arkansas during and after the Reconstruction era.

== See also ==
- List of plantations in the United States
- National Register of Historic Places listings in Chicot County, Arkansas
