= Foote, Mississippi =

- Unincorporated community
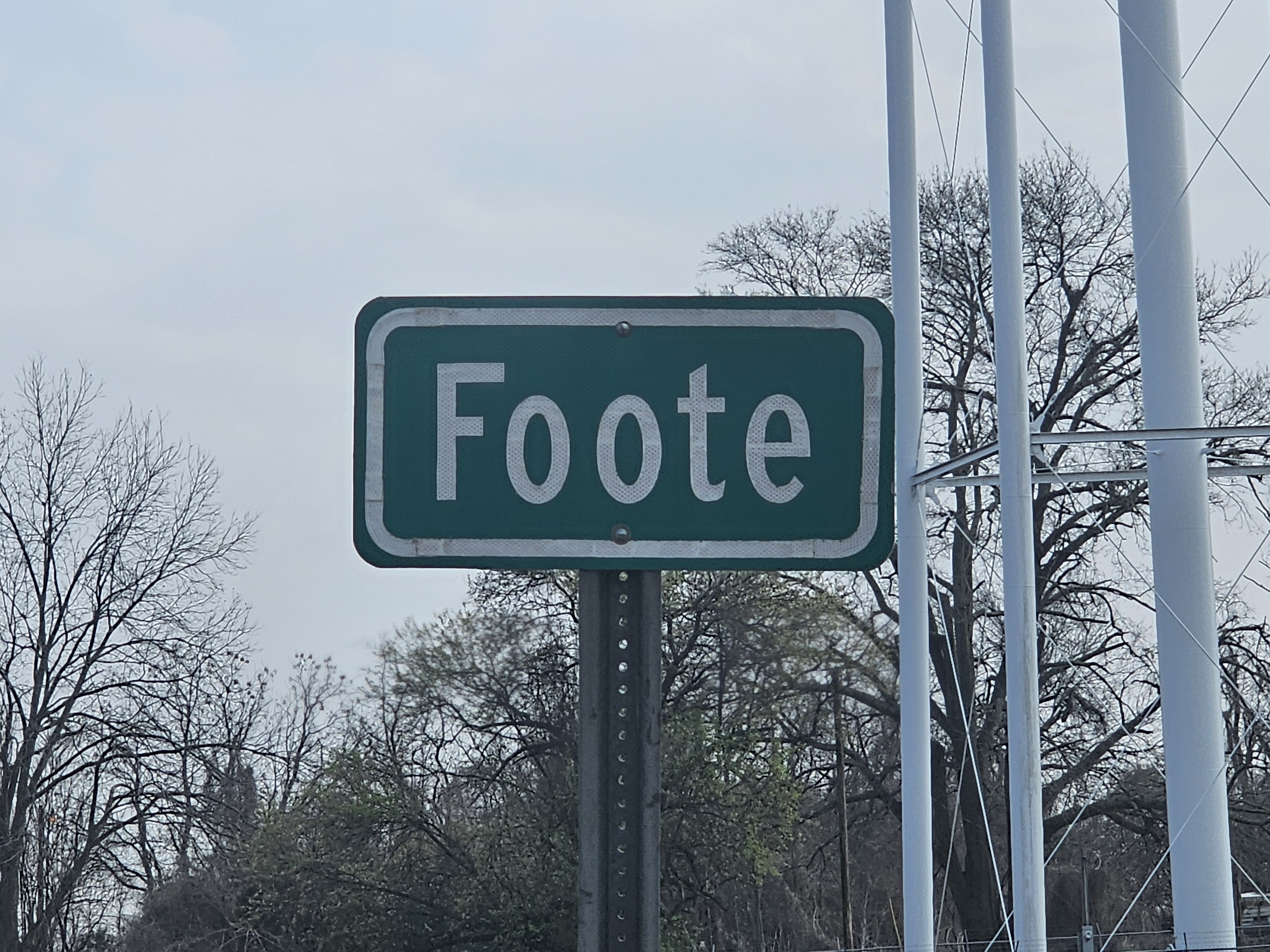
- Sign and Water Tower in Foote

- Location within Mississippi Location within the United States
- Coordinates: 33°05′29″N 91°01′57″W
- Country: United States
- State: Mississippi
- County: Washington
- Elevation: 112 ft (34 m)
- Time zone: UTC-6 (Central (CST))
  - Summer (DST): UTC-5 (CDT)
- ZIP code: 38748
- GNIS feature ID: 691864

Foote is an unincorporated community in Washington County, Mississippi, United States. Variant names include Colmere and Dudley.

== Location ==
Foote is located on the east shore of Lake Washington. On the West side is Yazoo National Wildlife Refuge. The community has two roads: Mississippi Highway 1, and Yazoo Refuge Road.

== History ==
Mount Holly is a plantation house located in Foote, and is listed on the National Register of Historic Places. The land around Mount Holly was patented in 1831 by John C. Miller. Mount Holly became the property of Hezekiah William Foote in the 1880s. Hezekiah was a wealthy planter, Confederate officer, and member of the Mississippi House of Representatives and Mississippi Senate. Mount Holly was inherited by Hezekiah's son Huger Lee Foote, a planter and member of the Mississippi Senate. Huger's grandson was author Shelby Foote.
