= Huger Lee Foote =

American politician (1854–1915)

- Born: April 24, 1854; Macon, Mississippi, U.S.
- Died: July 18, 1915 (aged 61); Greenville, Mississippi, U.S.
- Occupations: Planter, politician, poker player
- Children: Shelby Dade Foote
- Parent(s): Hezekiah William Foote; Lucinda Frances Dade Foote
- Relatives: Shelby Foote (grandson)

Huger Lee Foote (April 24, 1854 – July 18, 1915) was an American planter and politician. He served in the Mississippi Senate. He later sold his plantations to pay for his gambling debts.

== Early life ==
Huger Lee Foote was born on April 24, 1854, in Macon, Mississippi. His father, Hezekiah William Foote, was a planter and politician. His mother, Lucinda Frances Dade Foote, inherited 3,000 acres of land in Issaquena County, Mississippi. She died when he was two years old. He was educated at Chillicothe Business College in Ohio and in Texas.

== Career ==
Foote served as the Sheriff of Sharkey County, Mississippi. He served as a member of the Mississippi Senate. He later served as secretary and treasurer of the Mississippi Levee Board.

Foote managed his father's four large plantations in the Mississippi Delta:

- the Mounds Plantation near Rolling Fork in Sharkey County, Mississippi.
- the Egremont Plantation in Egremont, Mississippi.
- the Hardscramble Plantation.
- the Mount Holly Plantation in Foote, Mississippi.

His father willed him the Mount Holly Plantation in the late 1880s. He later inherited the other plantations, but sold them to pay for his gambling debts. Indeed, by then, he had moved to Greenville, Mississippi, where he played poker at the Elks Club.

== Death and legacy ==
Foote died on July 18, 1915, in Greenville, Mississippi.

His grandson, Shelby Foote, became a renowned author of historic novels. In his 1949 novel entitled Tournament, the character of Hugh Bart is based on Huger Lee Foote.
