= Benjamin Winslow Dudley =

American surgeon and educator (1785–1870)

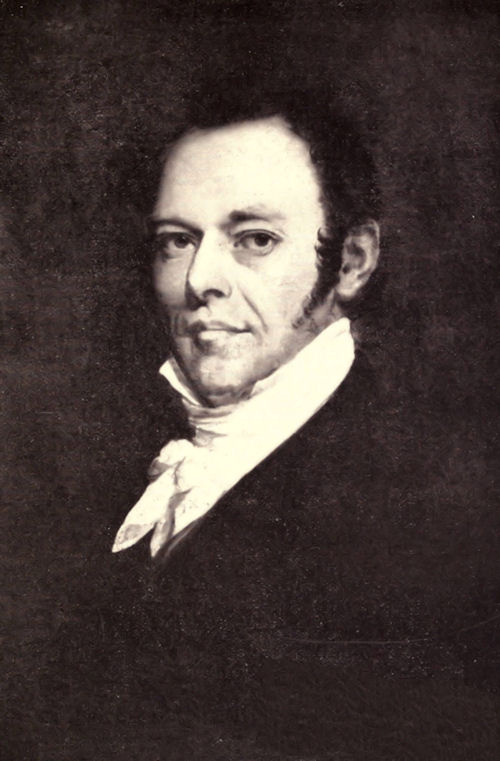
- Born: April 12, 1785; Spotsylvania County, Virginia
- Died: January 20, 1870 (aged 84); Lexington, Fayette County, Kentucky
- Resting place: Lexington Cemetery
- Education: University of Pennsylvania
- Occupation: Surgeon
- Spouse: Anna Maria Short (m. 1821)
- Children: 3

Benjamin Winslow Dudley (April 12, 1785 – January 20, 1870) was an American surgeon and academic in Kentucky, United States. Trained at the University of Pennsylvania, in London, and in Paris, he performed hundreds of lithotomy, trephinations and treated aneurysms. In his lectures and writing, he stressed the importance of preparation and cleanliness. He served as a professor of medicine at Transylvania University from 1817 to 1850, where he taught many future physicians who treated members (and later veterans) of the Confederate States Army.

== Early life ==
Benjamin Winslow Dudley was born on April 12, 1785, in Spotsylvania County, Virginia. His father was Ambrose Parson Dudley and his mother, the former Ann Parker. By the age of one, in 1786, he moved to Bryan Station, Kentucky, an early fortified settlement near Lexington, with his parents and six siblings. By 1797, they moved to Lexington. One of his brothers, Reverend Thomas Parker Dudley, later served as a Baptist pastor in Georgetown, Kentucky from 1827 to 1880.

Dudley was trained by Dr Frederick Ridgely in Lexington. He attended the medical school at the University of Pennsylvania in Philadelphia, graduating in 1806. He briefly attended Transylvania University in Lexington.

Dudley took a break from his studies to get on a flatboat along the Mississippi River to buy flour and sell it for profit to Europeans. With that money, he traveled to London, where he continued his medical studies from 1810 to 1814. His professors included John Abernethy and Samuel Cooper, two prominent surgeons. Dudley subsequently joined the Royal College of Surgeons of England. He also studied in Paris, where one of his professors was no other than Baron Dominique Larrey, Emperor Napoleon's personal physician. Dudley moved back to Lexington in 1816.

== Career ==
Dudley was appointed as the Chair of the Department of Anatomy and Surgery at Transylvania University in 1817. He also served as Professor of Medicine until 1850. Over the course of more than three decades, he hired faculty members to the department and oversaw the medical education of over 6,000 students. One day, Dudley had an argument with a colleague, William H. Richardson. The two men resolved their disagreement over a duel. After Dudley won the duel, both men became friends.

Many of his students who became physicians in their own rights, went on to treat members of the Confederate States Army during the American Civil War of 1861–1865, and later veterans. However, the focus on cleanliness which Dudley had taught them only caught on when Joseph Lister, 1st Baron Lister published his research on antiseptics in 1867, after the war.

As a surgeon, Dudley performed lithotomy, or gallstone removal, up to 225 times. He also performed trephination, the practice of drilling a hole in a patient's head to cure him of traumatic epilepsy. Moreover, he performed surgery on patients with aneurysms. He focused on the importance of preparation and cleanliness. In 1836, Dudley wrote Observations on the nature and treatment of calculous diseases.

Dudley became known for his expertise as a surgeon throughout the Western United States.

== Personal life ==
Dudley married Anna Maria Short on June 8, 1821. They had two sons, Charles Wilkins Dudley and William Ambrose Dudley. Their daughter, Anna, married Edward R. Tilford. They resided at the Fairlawn mansion in Lexington, Kentucky. The house is now listed on the National Register of Historic Places listings in Fayette County, Kentucky.

== Death and legacy ==
Dudley died on January 20, 1870, in Lexington, Kentucky.

Dudley was commended in the Annals of Medical History. His portrait, painted by Matthew Harris Jouett in 1825–1826, can be seen at the Frick Collection on the Upper East Side of New York City.
