= Andrew Hull Foote =

Union Navy admiral and United States Navy admiral

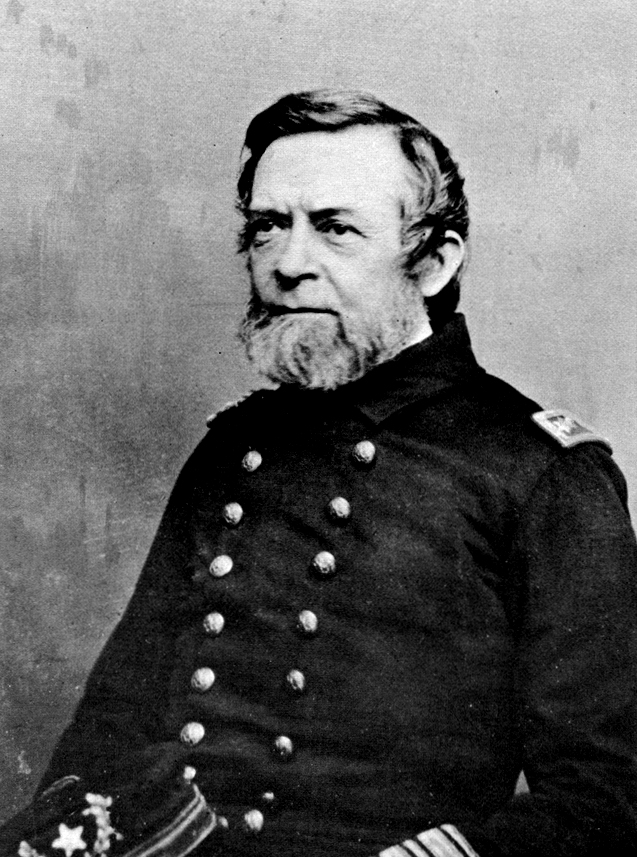
- Admiral Foote
- Born: September 12, 1806; New Haven, Connecticut, U.S.
- Died: June 26, 1863 (aged 56); New York City, New York, U.S.
- Burial place: Grove Street Cemetery, New Haven, Connecticut, U.S.
- Military career
- Allegiance: United States
- Branch: United States Navy (Union Navy)
- Service years: 1822–1863
- Rank: Rear admiral
- Commands: USS Perry; USS Portsmouth; Western Gunboat Flotilla
- Conflicts: Suppression of the Slave Trade Second Opium War: Battle of the Pearl River Forts; American Civil War: Battle of Fort Henry; Battle of Fort Donelson; Battle of Island No. 10
- Awards: Thanks of Congress

Andrew Hull Foote (September 12, 1806 – June 26, 1863) was an American naval officer who was noted for his service in the American Civil War and also for his contributions to several naval reforms in the years prior to the war. When the war came, he was appointed to command of the Western Gunboat Flotilla, predecessor of the Mississippi River Squadron. In that position, he led the gunboats in the Battle of Fort Henry. For his services with the Western Gunboat Flotilla, Foote was among the first naval officers to be promoted to the then-new rank of rear admiral. (Note: Three others were nominated at the same time as Foote but stood higher on the list submitted to Congress: David G. Farragut, Samuel Francis Du Pont, and Louis M. Goldsborough.)

== Early life ==
Foote was born at New Haven, Connecticut, the son of Senator Samuel A. Foot (or Foote) and Eudocia Hull. As a child Foote was not known as a good student, but showed a keen interest in one day going to sea. His father compromised and had him entered at the United States Military Academy at West Point, New York. Six months later in 1822, he left West Point and accepted an appointment as a midshipman in the United States Navy.

== Antebellum naval service ==
Between 1822 and 1843, Foote saw service in the Caribbean, Pacific, and Mediterranean, African Coast and at the Philadelphia Navy Yard. He first began as a midshipman on USS Grampus. In 1830, he was commissioned a lieutenant, and was stationed in the Mediterranean. In 1837, Foote circumnavigated the globe in USS John Adams. After serving on sea, Foote was put in charge of the Philadelphia Naval Asylum. After serving on land he went back to sea, and organized a Temperance Society aboard USS Cumberland. This group developed into a movement that resulted in ending the policy of supplying grog to U.S. Naval personnel.

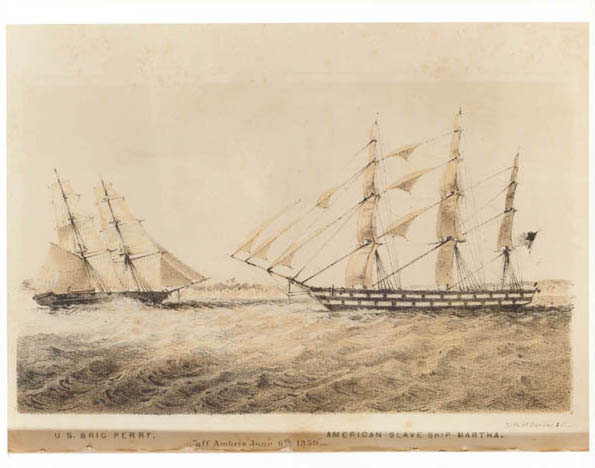
Foote's USS Perry confronting the slave ship Marta of Ambriz on June 6, 1850

From 1849 to 1851, Foote commanded USS Perry, cruising the waters off the African coast. He was active in suppressing the slave trade there. This experience persuaded him to support the cause of abolition, and in 1854, he published a 390-page book, Africa and the American Flag. In this book, Admiral Foote described the geography of the African continent, the customs of many of the African people, the establishment of American colonies in Africa, the slave-trade and its evils and the need to protect American citizens and commerce abroad. He also became a frequent speaker on the Abolitionist circuit.

Foote was promoted to Commander in 1856, and took command of USS Portsmouth in the East India Squadron. With this command, Foote was assigned the mission of observing British operations against Canton, China, during the Second Opium War. This eventually resulted in his being attacked from Chinese shore batteries. Foote led a landing party that seized the barrier forts along the Pearl River in reprisal for the attack. This led to a short occupation by the U.S. Navy of Chinese territory.

Foote returned to the Continental United States in 1858, and took command of the Brooklyn Navy Yard, in Brooklyn, New York, a post he held until the outbreak of the hostilities of the Civil War.

== Personal life and family ==
As the Civil War began, Foote wrote a letter (see image) to his three youngest children on August 31, 1861. In it he expresses his love for them and the fact that he is going to war and may be killed. He closes with the phrase "God grant that you all may at last rest in heaven my dear children, is the prayer of your affectionate father." 1862 was a time of great personal loss for Foote. Seven months after this letter was written, his son William Leffingwell died March 14, 1862, at the age of thirteen. On October 14 of that year, his daughter Emily Frederica died at age ten. Six days later, his youngest daughter Maria Eudocia died at age seven. Foote and his wife Caroline Augusta Street Foote had lost three children in seven months.

When Foote died in 1863, he left behind two sons, Augustus Russell Street (age sixteen) and John Samuel, and one adult daughter, Josephine, from his first marriage to Caroline Flagg. Caroline Augusta Street died two months after Foote on August 27, 1863. Youngest son John Samuel, nicknamed "Admiral Byng" by Foote, was orphaned at age four.

== Civil War and death ==
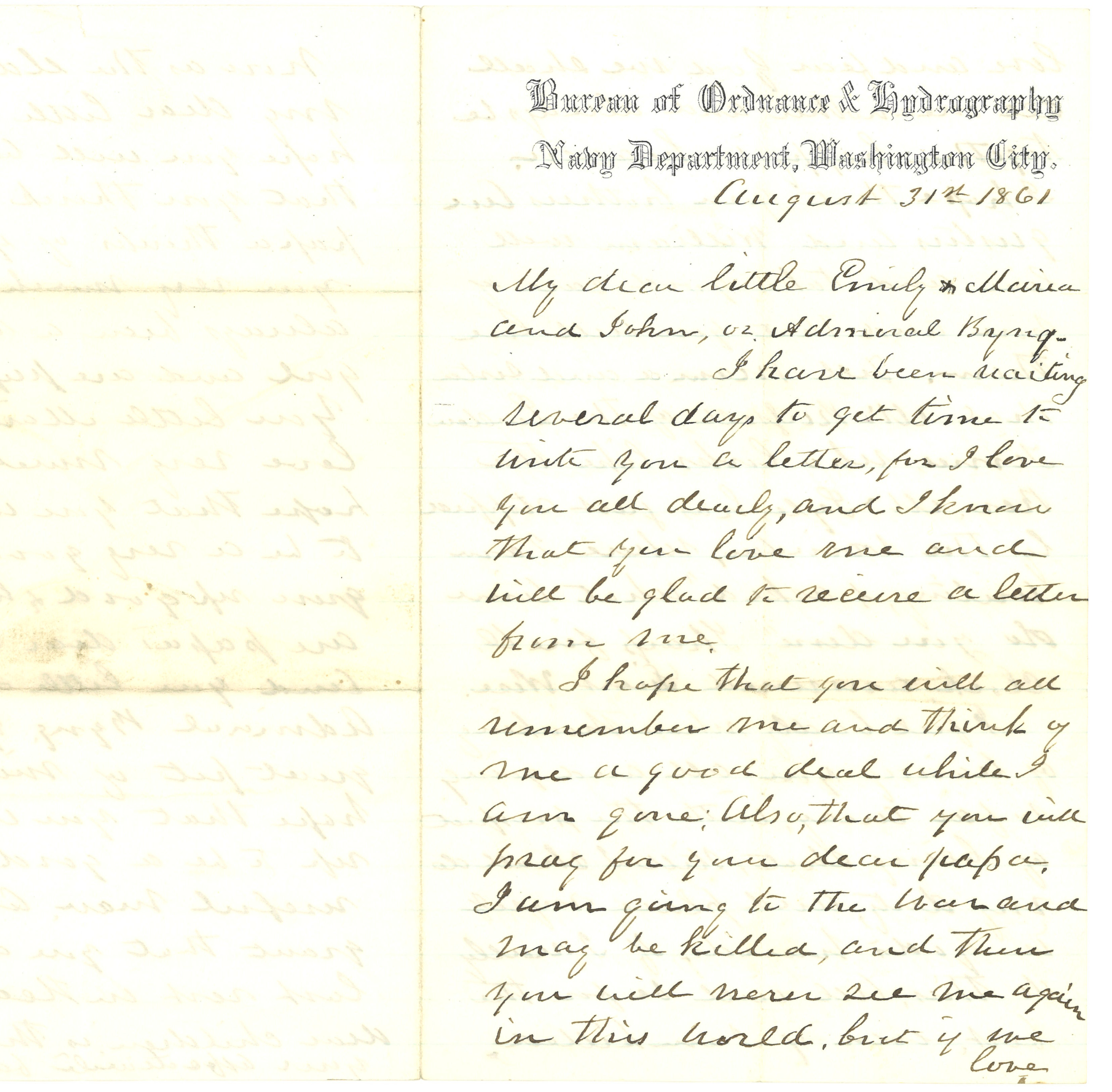
1861 letter from Foote to his children, page 1

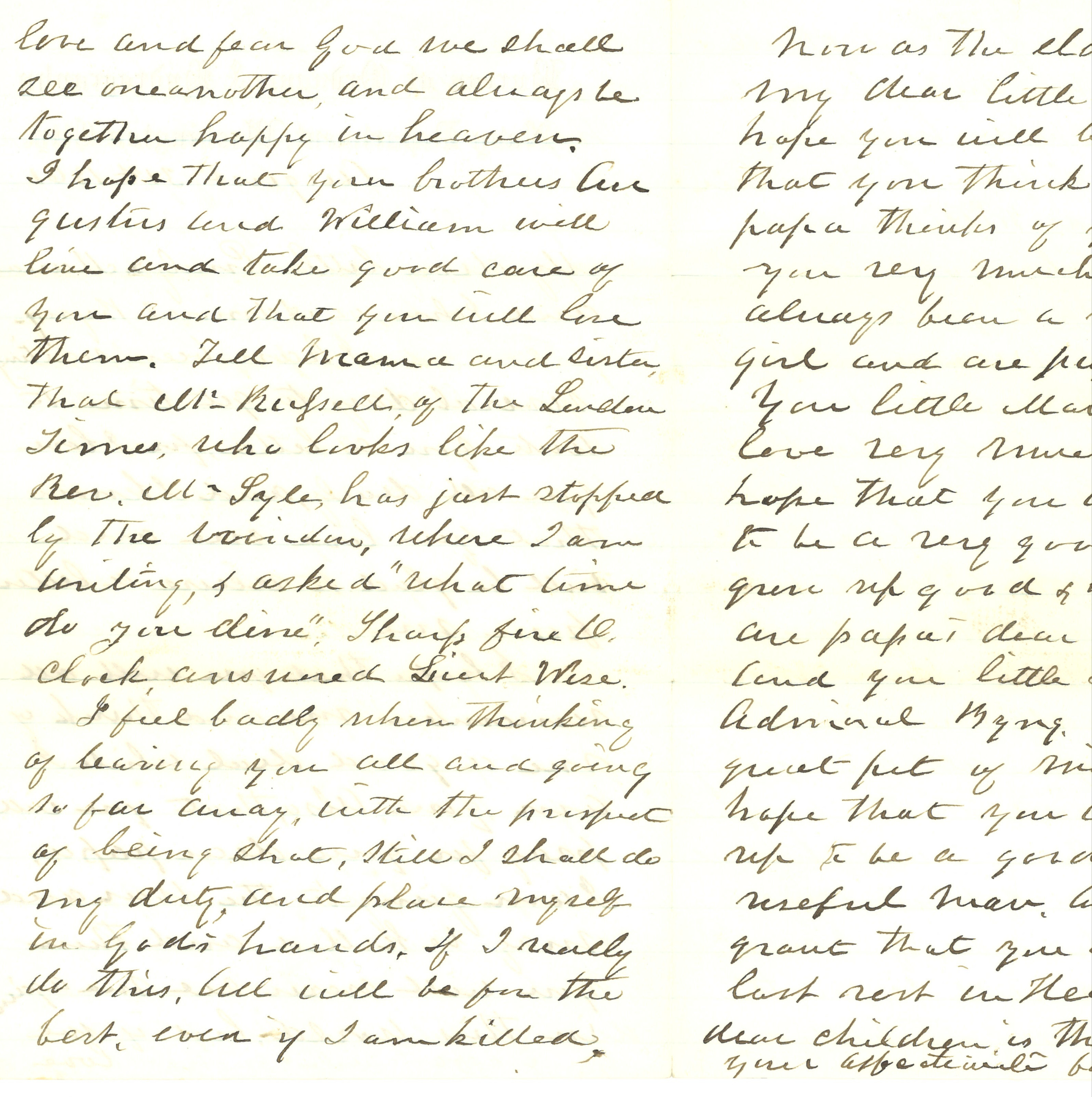
Page 2

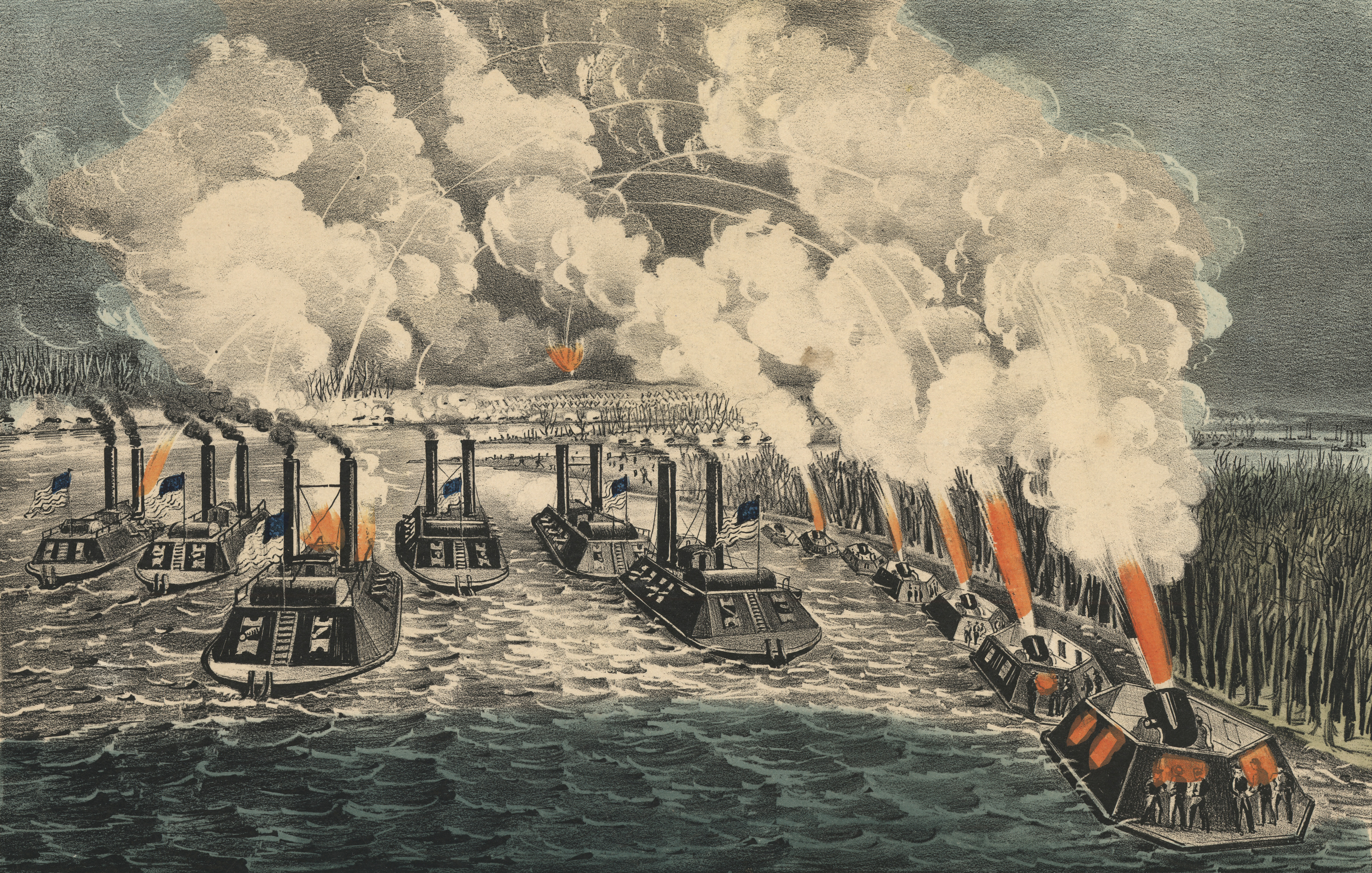
Union Army ironclads in 1862 action in art, Bombardment of Island "Number Ten" in the Mississippi River

When the American Civil War began in 1861, Foote was in command of the New York Navy Yard. On June 29, 1861, Foote was promoted to captain. From 1861 to 1862, Foote commanded the Mississippi River Squadron with distinction, organizing and leading the gunboat flotilla in many of the early battles of the Western Theater of the American Civil War. Even though Foote was an officer in the United States Navy, the Western Flotilla was under the jurisdiction of the Union Army. In early February 1862, now holding the rank of flag officer (equivalent to the modern commodore), he cooperated with General Ulysses S. Grant against Fort Henry on the Tennessee River. Despite heavy damage to one of the gunboats, Foote was able to quickly subdue the fort. When the Confederate garrison commander, Brig. Gen. Lloyd Tilghman, sent out a flag of truce asking the terms of surrender, Foote sent back a blunt reply, “No sir, your surrender will be unconditional!”

Several days later Grant, with three divisions, and Foote with his fleet of ironclads, along with the assistance of Captain Seth Ledyard Phelps and his fleet of timberclad warships, moved against Fort Donelson on the Cumberland River. Hoping for a repeat of the success at Fort Henry, General Grant urged Foote to attack the fort's river batteries. Fort Donelson's guns, however, were better-placed than Fort Henry's were. Three of Foote's gunboats were damaged including the flagship, USS St. Louis. Foote himself received a wound in his foot. For his service at Forts Henry and Donelson, Foote received the Thanks of Congress. After repairing his flotilla, Foote joined with General John Pope in a campaign against Island Number Ten on the Mississippi River. In July 1862 Foote received a second Thanks of Congress, this time for the battles of Fort Henry, Fort Donelson and Island Number Ten.

Later in 1862, Foote was promoted to rear admiral. In 1863, on his way to take command of the South Atlantic Blockading Squadron, he suddenly died, struck down by Bright's disease. His untimely death in New York shocked the nation. He was interred at Grove Street Cemetery in New Haven.

== Namesakes ==
Three ships were named USS Foote for him. Civil War Fort Foote on the Potomac, now a National Park, was named for him on September 17, 1863.

Foote Street NE (and Foote Place) in Washington, DC is named for him, part of a series of streets named for Civil War generals.

== See also ==
- Bibliography of Naval history of the American Civil War
- Bibliography of American Civil War military leaders
- List of ships captured in the 19th century
- List of ships of the Confederate States Navy
- African Squadron

== Bibliography ==
- Eicher, David j. (2002). Civil War High Commands. Stanford University Press. ISBN 9780804780353.
- Hoppin, James Mason (1874). Life of Andrew Hull Foote rear-admiral United States Navy. Harper & Brothers, New York.
- Davenport, Charles Benedict; Scudder, Mary Theresa (1919). Naval officers: their heredity and development. Carnegie Institution of Washington.
- Crofut, Florence S. Marcy; "Guide to the history and the historic sites of Connecticut, Volume 2", Yale university press, (1937)
