= Lake Washington (Mississippi) =

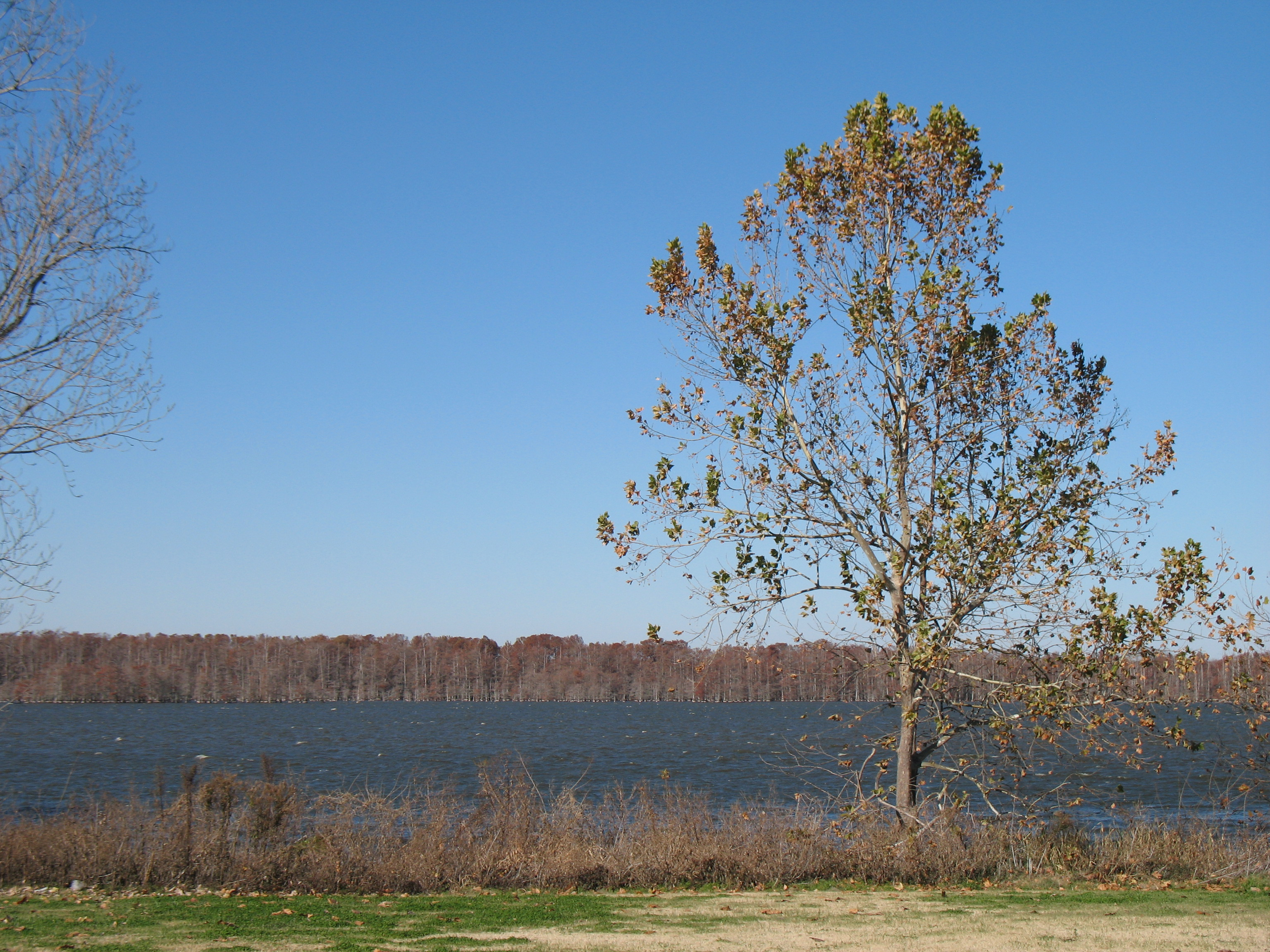

- Location within Mississippi Location within the United States
- Location: Washington County, Mississippi
- Coordinates: 33°04′00″N 91°02′48″W
- Type: Oxbow lake
- Primary outflows: Washington Bayou
- Basin countries: United States
- Surface area: 5,000 acres (2,000 ha)
- Average depth: 6 ft (1.8 m) to 22 ft (6.7 m)
- Surface elevation: 95 ft (29 m)
- Settlements: Chatham, Erwin, Glen Allan
- References: GNIS

Lake Washington is an oxbow lake in Washington County, Mississippi, United States.

Once part of the contiguous Mississippi River, Lake Washington formed when the river changed its course about 1300 AD.

== Characteristics ==
Lake vegetation includes duckweed and cypress trees.

Fish species found in Lake Washington include bowfin, bream (bluegill), buffalo, bullhead, carp, channel catfish, crappie, drum, flathead catfish, gar, green sunfish, hybrid white bass, largemouth bass, minnows, silversides and yellow bass.

== History ==
The first permanent residence in Washington County was located on Lake Washington. Frederick G. Turnbull settled on the lake in 1826 and named his place Linden The home currently located on the site, Linden, was erected in 1914 and was built by P.L. Mann and is listed on the National Register of Historic Places (HRHP).

Another pre-Civil War mansion, Mount Holly, constructed on the east shore of Lake Washington, is also listed on the NRHP.

The Junius Ward home was built at Erwin in 1826 as a log cabin, still standing today and is still owned by the same family.

The Law House, an impressive mansion overlooking the lake built in 1902, was ordered as a kit from the Sears & Roebuck Company, and was used in the filming of the 2012 movie Haunted.

Roy's Store is located on the north shore of the lake, and is noted for being in business at that location for over 100 years.

== Pollution ==
Most of the land surrounding Lake Washington is used extensively for agriculture. This has made the lake vulnerable to runoff of fertilizer, pesticides and herbicides. In 1973, the lake was closed to commercial fishing due to contamination, and in 1990, a blue-green algal bloom formed in the lake, which killed 14 dogs that drank from the water. Since then, extensive efforts have been made to reduce the lake's pollution.
