= Hezekiah William Foote =

American planter, politician and military officer (1813–1899)

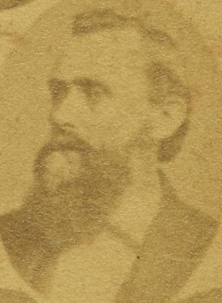
- Foote in 1878, by E. von Seutter

Member of the Mississippi Senate from the 17th district
- In office 1878–?
- Preceded by: Isham Stewart

Member of the Mississippi House of Representatives

Personal details
- Born: December 17, 1813 Chester County, South Carolina, US
- Died: January 29, 1899 (aged 85) Macon, Mississippi, US
- Party: Whig
- Other political affiliations: Constitutional Union
- Children: Huger Lee Foote
- Relatives: Henry S. Foote (distant cousin); Shelby Foote (great-grandson)
- Occupation: Planter, politician, military officer

Military service
- Allegiance: Confederate States of America
- Branch/service: Confederate States Army
- Rank: Colonel
- Unit: 1st Mississippi Cavalry Regiment; Mississippi State Troops
- Battles/wars: American Civil War; Battle of Belmont; Battle of Shiloh

Hezekiah William Foote (or Henry Foote; December 17, 1813 – January 29, 1899) was an American planter, politician, and military officer. He served in the American Civil War.

== Early life ==
Foote was born on December 17, 1813, in Chester County, South Carolina. He was a distant cousin of Henry S. Foote. As a teenager, he moved to Macon. He read law and was later admitted to the bar.

== Career ==
Foote raised cattle in Noxubee County, becoming the first settler to raise pedigree cattle in Mississippi. Meanwhile, he started a newspaper called The Macon Intelligencer. He then served as clerk of Noxubee County's court of equity, and was later elected a district judge. He joined the Whig Party and later the Constitutional Union Party. In 1856, he unsuccessfully ran for the Mississippi House of Representatives.

By 1860, Foote was a secessionist in favor of the Confederate States of America. During the American Civil War, he served as captain of the Noxubee Cavalry, 1st Mississippi Cavalry Regiment during the Battle of Belmont and the Battle of Shiloh, and later served as a colonel of a Mississippi State Troops cavalry regiment.

Foote was elected as a member of the Mississippi House of Representatives and the Mississippi State Senate. He also served as president of the Farmers and Merchants Bank of Macon.

Foote owned four plantations in the Mississippi Delta:

- the Mounds Plantation near Rolling Fork in Sharkey County, Mississippi.
- the Egremont Plantation.
- the Hardscramble Plantation.
- the Mount Holly Plantation in Foote, Mississippi. He acquired it in the early 1880s.

Foote served as superintendent of the Methodist Sunday School in Macon, Mississippi, for fifty-six years. He was one of the cofounders of Vanderbilt University and served on its board of trustees.

== Personal life and death ==
In 1836, Foote married Lucinda Frances Dade (1816–1856). She inherited 3,000 acres of land in Issaquena County. Together they had a son, Huger. He died on January 29, 1899, in Macon, where he was buried. His great-grandson was Shelby Foote, the Civil War author.
