= National Register of Historic Places listings in Washington County, Mississippi =

Location of Washington County in Mississippi

This is a list of the National Register of Historic Places listings in Washington County, Mississippi.

This is intended to be a complete list of the properties and districts on the National Register of Historic Places in Washington County, Mississippi, United States. Latitude and longitude coordinates are provided for many National Register properties and districts; these locations may be seen together in a map.

There are 25 properties and districts listed on the National Register in the county, including 1 National Historic Landmark. Another property was once listed but has been removed.

This National Park Service list is complete through NPS recent listings posted February 27, 2026.

== Current listings ==
	Name on the Register	Image	Date listed	Location	City or town	Description
1	Arcola Mounds		January 3, 1991 (#90002118)	Southwestern quarter of the southwestern quarter of Section 12, Township 16 North, Range 7 West; 33°14′40″N 90°52′55″W	Arcola vicinity	
2	Armitage Herschell Carousel	Armitage Herschell Carousel	March 28, 2012 (#12000155)	323 Main St. 33°24′38″N 91°03′46″W	Greenville	
3	Bank of Washington	Bank of Washington	July 16, 1987 (#87001209)	120 S. Poplar St. 33°24′42″N 91°03′46″W	Greenville	
4	Belmont Plantation	Belmont Plantation	April 11, 1972 (#72000702)	Junction of Mississippi Highways 1 and 438; 33°16′09″N 91°01′59″W	Wayside	
5	Doe's Eat Place	Doe's Eat Place	April 11, 1972 (#12000156)	502 Nelson St. 33°24′56″N 91°03′22″W	Greenville	
6	Finlay House	Finlay House	April 27, 1982 (#82003119)	137 N. Poplar St. 33°24′47″N 91°03′42″W	Greenville	Demolished in 2009
7	First National Bank of Greenville	First National Bank of Greenville	January 30, 1978 (#78003195)	Main and S. Poplar Sts. 33°24′39″N 91°03′47″W	Greenville	
8	Gamwyn Park Historic District	Gamwyn Park Historic District	August 11, 2004 (#04000820)	Bounded by Gamwyn Park Dr., N. Gamwyn Dr., E. Gamwyn Dr., S. Dr., and W. Gamwyn Dr. 33°23′22″N 91°02′51″W	Greenville	
9	Greenville Commercial Historic District	Greenville Commercial Historic District	October 10, 1997 (#97000235)	Roughly Main St. from Walnut to Poplar Sts. 33°24′38″N 91°03′48″W	Greenville	
10	Griffin-Spragins House		April 5, 1984 (#84002445)	Southwest of Greenville off U.S. Route 82; 33°17′47″N 91°08′05″W	Refuge	
11	Hollandale Downtown Historic District		January 15, 2014 (#13001084)	Washington St. from East to Morgan Aves. 33°10′07″N 90°51′17″W	Hollandale	
12	Hollyknowe	Hollyknowe	October 10, 1985 (#85003004)	Southeast of the junction of U.S. Route 82 and County Road 299; 33°24′02″N 90°49′59″W	Leland vicinity	
13	Leavenworth-Wasson-Carroll House	Leavenworth-Wasson-Carroll House	July 23, 1980 (#80002306)	623 S. Washington Ave. 33°23′55″N 91°03′08″W	Greenville	
14	Leland Historic District	Leland Historic District	October 12, 2004 (#04001144)	Portions of N. and S. Broad, N. and S. Main, Deer Creek Dr., and 3rd St. 33°24′16″N 90°53′58″W	Leland	
15	Linden		November 12, 1982 (#82000581)	North of the Glen Allan junction of Mississippi Highways 69 and 97; 33°02′56″N 91°01′50″W	Glen Allan vicinity	
16	Live Oak Cemetery		February 2, 2023 (#100008599)	1447 South Main St. 33°22′58″N 91°03′15″W	Greenville	
17	Mount Holly	Mount Holly	August 14, 1973 (#73001030)	Northwest of Foote off Mississippi Highway 1; 33°05′42″N 91°02′12″W	Foote vicinity	Destroyed by fire June 2015
18	Old Delta Democrat Times Building	Old Delta Democrat Times Building	March 25, 1982 (#82003120)	201-203 Main St. 33°24′43″N 91°03′53″W	Greenville	
19	U.S. Post Office	U.S. Post Office	April 21, 1983 (#83000969)	204 N. Broad St. 33°24′21″N 90°53′47″W	Leland	
20	Junius R. Ward House	Junius R. Ward House	April 28, 1975 (#75001060)	Old Mississippi Highway 1; 33°06′13″N 91°02′50″W	Erwin	
21	Washington Avenue-Main Street Historic District	Washington Avenue-Main Street Historic District	May 3, 1984 (#84002446)	Roughly bounded by railroad tracks, Yerger, Arnold Ave., and Cherry St. 33°24′09″N 91°03′07″W	Greenville	
22	Washington County Courthouse	Washington County Courthouse	September 10, 2014 (#14000570)	900 Washington Ave. 33°24′26″N 91°03′12″W	Greenville	
23	Weinberg House		September 28, 2017 (#100001683)	639 Central St. 33°24′24″N 91°03′36″W	Greenville	
24	Wetherbee House	Wetherbee House	October 28, 1977 (#77000797)	509 Washington Ave. 33°24′38″N 91°03′36″W	Greenville	
25	Winterville Site	Winterville Site	August 17, 1973 (#73001031)	Along Mississippi Highway 1, approximately 6 miles (9.7 km) north of Greenville; 33°29′09″N 91°03′40″W	Greenville	

== Former listing ==
	Name on the Register	Image	Date listed	Date removed	Location	City or town	Description
1	Atterbury House		November 24, 1982 (#82000580)	June 19, 1987	148 N. Broadway	Greenville	Demolished in December 1986

== See also ==
- List of National Historic Landmarks in Mississippi
- National Register of Historic Places listings in Mississippi
