= Oyster Fly Rods =

Oyster Fly Rods is a bamboo fly rod making business in Blue Ridge, Georgia. It belongs to famous fly fisherman Bill Oyster, who makes "every one" of the forty custom rods produced each year by hand, as well as a few standardized rods. He described the process as: "I split each twelve-foot length of cane into six strips... Then, depending on the length, number of pieces, and action wanted, I plane each strip of cane to thousandths of an inch. I also engrave all the nickel and silver hardware, which takes as long as the actual creation of the rod." The rods have fast action, include distinctive engravings, "elegant" rattan grips, and are "remarkably fishable". Oyster Fly Rods was a winner in the "Sporting" category of Garden & Gun magazine's "Made in the South" 2010 competition.

Oyster moved the business from Gainesville, Georgia to Blue Ridge in 2009. He has fished around the U.S. and in Argentina. The custom rods sell for as much as $10,000 each and "at least a couple have gone into the hands of former President Jimmy Carter." Oyster also offers rod-making classes.
