= Donn Young =

American photographer (born 1950)

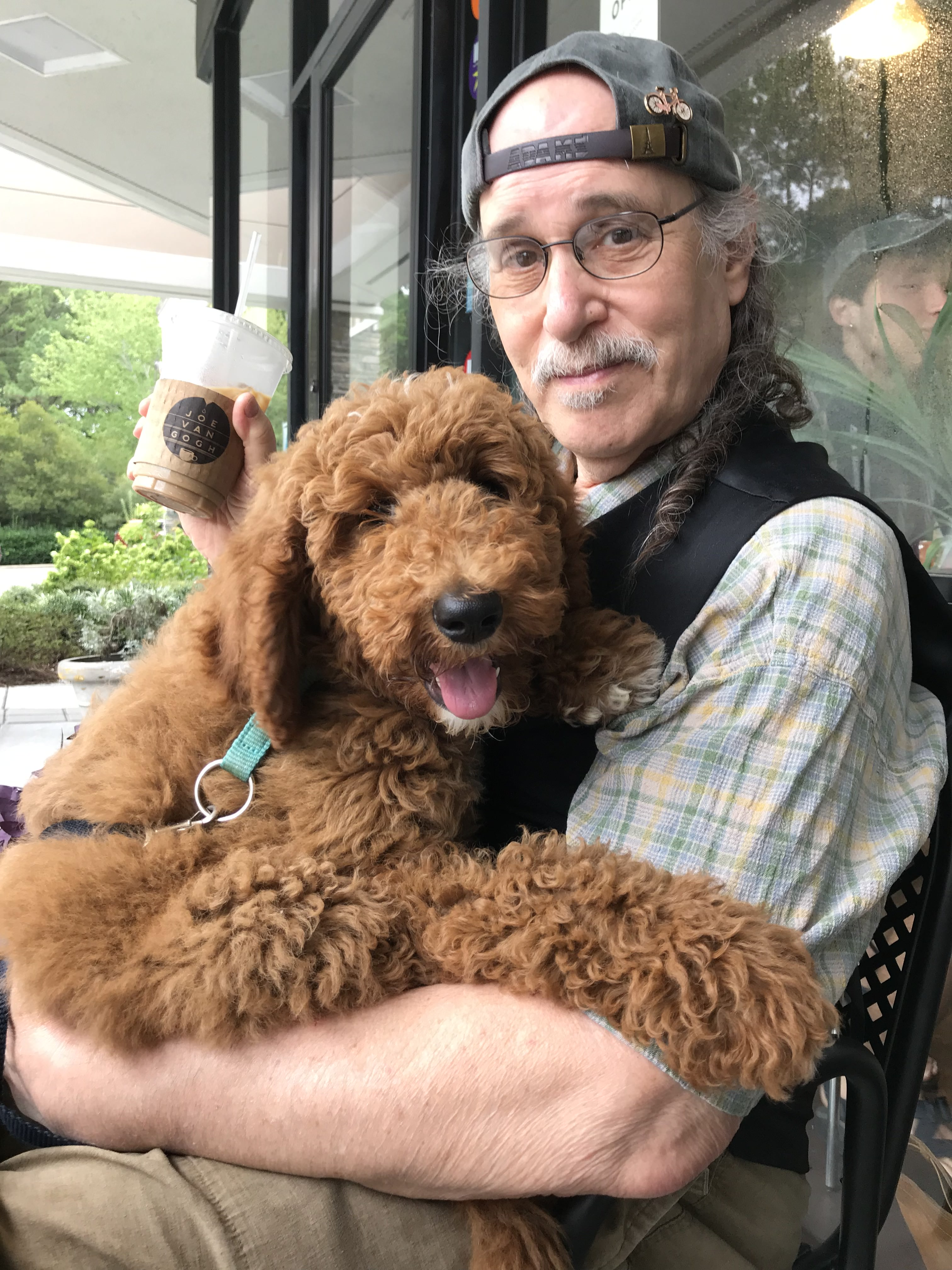
- Born: Donald Young; July 6, 1950 (age 76); Baltimore, Maryland
- Style: Photojournalism
- Movement: Photography
- Spouse: Katie Bowler Young (m. 2012)
- Children: 4
- Website: https://donnyoungphotography.zenfolio.com/

Donald 'Donn' Young (born July 6, 1950) is an American photographer who specializes in photojournalism, most notably for his coverage of the effects of Hurricane Katrina. Young was born in Baltimore, Maryland and then relocated to New Orleans, Louisiana in his young adulthood. Many of Young's works are centered around Hurricane Katrina, poverty and health crisis', and social justice.

== Early life and education ==
Young has been photographing since his grandfather gave him a Brownie camera at the age of 8. He attended the University of Baltimore from 1969 to 1971 and then the University of Massachusetts from 1972 to 1973, until ultimately deciding to focus on his career – he left school to become a staff photographer at the Valley Advocate Newspaper where he worked until 1980.

== Career ==
Up until 2012, he continued to work as a staff photographer at a number of other newspapers such as City Business Newspaper, Gambit Newspaper, artsee Magazine, and more, as well as working as a port photojournalist at the Port of New Orleans. During this time and continuing until today, Young contributes to and curates exhibitions and collaborates with fellow artists. While he has primarily become as assignment photographer, he specializes in and has a particular passion for photojournalism related to social justice.

From 2005 to 2008, Young directed the 40 Days and 40 Nights series, which was a collaborative effort of Louisiana artists documenting Hurricane Katrina and its effects. During this series, Young documented the making of "After the Storm", a documentary focusing on producers and actors that went to New Orleans following the storm to help local youth rebuild through theatre.

During Hurricane Katrina, Young's Lakeview studio and entire body of work was submerged underneath water and heavily damaged, subject to the contents of the city's sewage. His work did not take well to being submerged for nearly a month, but with the help of Special Collections team at Louisiana State University, some of his work was able to be recovered. In doing so, he donated the entirety of his collection to the LSU Libraries.

In 2008, Young relocated to North Carolina and became involved in the art scene throughout the entire state, but primarily in Chapel Hill, Hillsborough, and Durham. In 2017, he founded, directed, and contributed to artist collective Artists United, including their "The Walls We Build", a Triangle-wide exhibition that examines the metaphorical walls that we've built between communities and how we can break them down. In 2021, Young joined onto a collaborative public art project, Say Their Names, which is intended to pay tribute to African American voices throughout history. Currently, Young works as an assignment photographer for the College of Arts and Sciences at UNC Chapel Hill.

== Exhibitions ==
- Portraits of Freedom, Juneteenth at the ENO Arts Mill, Hillsborough, NC

== Web, journal, and magazine publications ==
- The Sun Magazine; Contributor
- "Living Legends of Jazz" by Michael White, Garden & Gun; Primary Contributor
- "CAFOs and Environmental Justice: The Case of North Carolina" by Wendee Nicole, EHP Publishing; Primary Contributor
- "Illuminating hidden Carolina voices through performance", UNC College of Arts and Sciences; Primary Contributor
- "Lights on the Hill", UNC College of Arts and Sciences; Primary Contributor
- "Science art that rocks" by Kim Spurr, UNC College of Arts and Sciences; Primary Contributor
- "Discover New Orleans: A Mississippi River Experience: New Orleanians and the Levee", by L. Timothy Lupin; Contributor
- "Sky, Scale and Technology in Art" by Otto Piene; Contributor
- "The Angolite" by Goodlow, Guzman, and Glover; Contributor

== Books ==
- Life Sentences: Rage and Survival Behind Bars, Contributor
- New Orleans: The Making of an Urban Landscape, Contributor
- Geography: Realms, Regions, and Concepts, 8th Ed., Contributor
- Geography: Realms, Regions, and Concepts, 9th Ed., Contributor
- Railroading Along the Waterfront, Contributor
- A Unique Slant of Light, Contributor

== Recognitions ==
- Photographer of the Year 1978, New England Press Association
- Photographer of the Year 1986, New Orleans Advertising Association
- American Creativity Gold Award 1986, Louisiana Creative Award Association
- Gold Award 1993, Art Director and Designers' Association
- Award of Excellence 1994, New Orleans Press Club*
- Award of Excellence 1995, New Orleans Press Club*
- Award of Excellence 1996, New Orleans Press Club*
- Best Photograph Editorial 1996, Louisiana Press Association*
- Bronze Quill Award of Achievement 1997, single color photo, International Association of Business Communication*
- Bronze Quill Award of Achievement 1997, single B&W photo, International Association of Business Communication*
- Bronze Quill Award of Achievement 1998, single color photo, International Association of Business Communication*
- Bronze Quill Award of Achievement 1998, single B&W photo, International Association of Business Communication*
