= Leland Historic District =

Leland Historic District may refer to:

- Leland Historic District (Leland, Michigan)
- Leland Historic District (Leland, Mississippi)
