= Julia Evans Reed =

American writer (1960–2020)

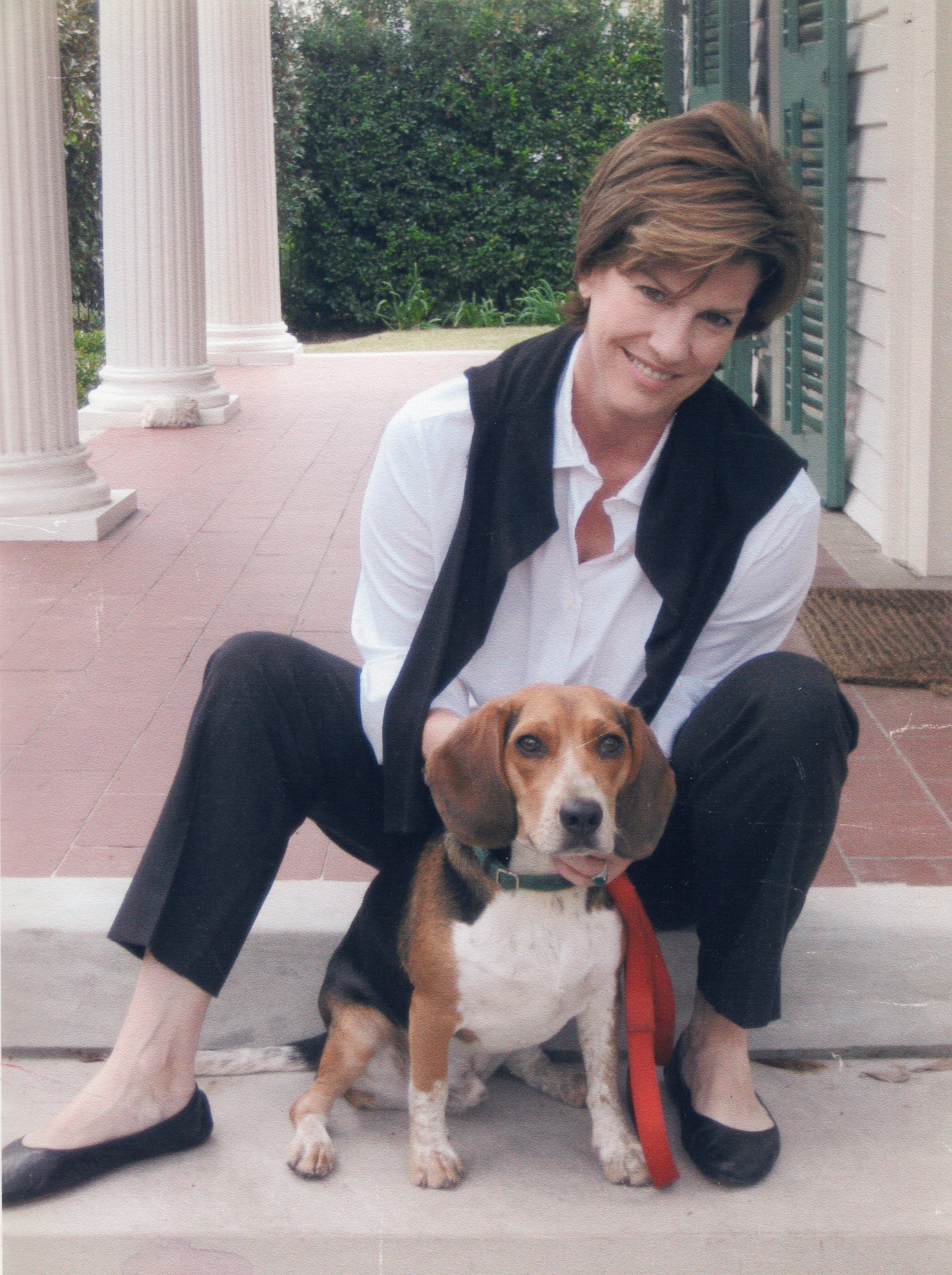

Julia Evans Reed (September 11, 1960 – August 28, 2020) was a Mississippi Delta born author, journalist, columnist, speaker, and socialite. Reed wrote several books on cooking, entertaining, and affluent southern lifestyle and culture.

== Early life and education ==
Reed was born in Greenville, Mississippi, and attended the Madeira School, a boarding school in McLean, Virginia. She studied at Georgetown University and American University, both in Washington, D.C. Her father, Clarke Reed, was a businessman and Republican Party leader. Her mother, Judy Brooks Reed, is from a prominent and wealthy Nashville family. As a child, Reed's parents hosted and entertained guests such as William F. Buckley Jr. and George and Barbara Bush.

== Career ==
Reed wrote her first article for the Washington Bureau of Newsweek magazine in 1980, covering the story of her former Madeira headmistress, Jean Harris' murder of partner Herman Tarnower. She continued with the magazine as a contributing editor and columnist.

Reed was a columnist at Garden & Gun from 2011. She was also an editor and writer for Vogue magazine since 1988, where she wrote about politics and culture and profiled the Clintons and Bushes, also interviewing Oprah Winfrey for The Wall Street Journal. She was a contributor to The New York Times, Conde Nast Traveler, The Wall Street Journal, U.S. News & World Report, and Elle Décor, among other publications.

She expanded the Delta Hot Tamale Festival from one-day to a three-day event, exponentially increasing the economic benefit to her hometown. Reed opened Brown Water Books, a bookstore in the historic Wetherbee House in Greenville. She was co-founder of Reed-Smythe, an online business supporting independent artisans. In 2019, she was named Cultural Ambassador of Mississippi’s Arts Commission. She served on the board of the Ogden Museum of Art in New Orleans, the Eudora Welty Foundation, and the Link Stryjewski Foundation.

== Personal life ==
Reed was married to John Pearce; the couple divorced in 2016. She maintained two residences, one in New Orleans and the other in Mississippi, on a property adjacent to her childhood home.

She died on August 28, 2020, from cancer.

== Selected works ==
Her books include:

- But Mama Always Puts Vodka in Her Sangria 2013
- Ham Biscuits, Hostess Gowns, and Other Southern Specialties
- Queen of the Turtle Derby and Other Southern Phenomena.
- The House on First Street: My New Orleans Story (P.S.)
- Julia Reed’s New Orleans: Food, Fun, and Field Trips for Letting the Good Times Roll
- Julia Reed's South: Spirited Entertaining and High-Style Fun All Year Long
- One Man's Folly: The Exceptional Houses of Furlow Gatewood
- South Toward Home: Adventures and Misadventures in My Native Land 2018
- S Is for Southern: A Guide to the South, from Absinthe to Zydeco (Garden & Gun Books)
