= Heather Richie =

American cultural writer and mariner

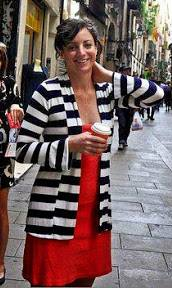
- Richie in 2015
- Occupations: writer and mariner
- Years active: since 2010
- Known for: foodways, experiential journalism

Heather Richie is an American writer and mariner whose work covers land traditions, foodways, and country sports.

== Early life and education ==
She attended the College of Charleston undergraduate program where she worked in the Writing Lab, and Sewanee: The University of the South, where her MFA thesis was accepted for publication by LSU Press. Before graduate school she worked a series of jobs, including on small farms and in bakeries, spending "10 years joining Teach for America, starting a real estate brokerage, making signs, delivering flowers and, finally, delivering the mail."

She later completed a certificate in documentary studies at Duke University and undertook a PhD at the University of KwaZulu-Natal.

Richie studies EU and US fisheries and maritime law.

== Career ==
=== Writing ===
Richie's bylines include Southern Living, Bonefish & Tarpon Trust Journal, Garden & Gun, Oxford American, Gastronomica, and Nieman Storyboard.

She was an editorial intern at Garden & Gun and Oxford American, and Associate Editor at Fiction Southeast. She served as adjunct faculty at Toccoa Falls College and LBC Universidad, and has served as a copywriter at Annapolis Performance Sailing and a digital producer for Roads & Kingdoms and Anthony Bourdain's Parts Unknown.

Richie has spoken at academic conferences including the 2016 Society for the Study of Southern Literature conference in Boston and the Dublin Gastronomy Symposium in 2018. She was a 2017 judge for the International Association of Culinary Professionals Food Writing Awards.

In 2020, Richie appeared on Christopher Kimball's Milk Street Radio.

=== Maritime and fishing ===
Richie is a licensed Maritime and Coastguard Agency mariner, having worked on international yacht crews after completing training with the Royal Yachting Association. She is a certified fishmonger. She has commented on European Union seafood labelling regulation and consumer protection in the Irish market. She told The Independent that consumers of salmon fed on chicken should be able "to decide for themselves whether they are comfortable with the practice". She is also a fly fisher and licensed commercial fisherman in the European Union and United States.

=== Publishing ===
Richie founded Fisher & Farmer, which is headquartered in Lymington, England, and opened in 2022 after delays caused by the COVID-19 pandemic. Based in Connemara, she has planned a "fish-to-table" tourism experience on the Killary Fjord.

=== Philanthropy ===
Fisher & Farmer has a charitable arm focused on food sovereignty, education and recreational fishing access. Richie is the founder of Autism Friendly Connemara, part of the Irish charity AsIAm's Autism Friendly Towns programme. She founded Les Dames d'Escoffier Ireland.

== Bibliography ==
- Full: A Slim Volume on Southern Foodways. Aisling Books, 2020.

== Recognition ==
In 2014, Richie was awarded a research grant from the John F. Kennedy Library Foundation, a New New South Editorial Fellowship at Duke University, and the Rivendell Writer-in-Residency from the Sewanee School of Letters. That same year, she was featured in the Southern Foodways Alliance's inaugural Spotlight series, and was named a scholarship finalist for the Lee Bros. Cookbook Boot Camp.

Richie received the Carnegie-Whitney Grant from the American Library Association under the direction of Jennifer France of American College of the Building Arts to compile "The Essential Wooden Boat Building Reading List". During the grant period she attended the wooden boat building school at Cape Fear Community College and produced an epistolary column for WoodenBoat.

In 2021, she received multiple scholarships including the Orvis 50/50 award to attend the Certified Fly Fishing Guide program at Colorado Mountain College.
