= Delta Democrat Times =

Newspaper in Greenville, Mississippi

- Type: Daily newspaper
- Owner: Delta Democrat Pub. Co.
- Founder: Hodding Carter
- Founded: 1938; 88 years ago
- Language: English
- City: Greenville, Mississippi
- Country: United States
- ISSN: 2831-6428 (print); 2831-6436 (web)
- OCLC number: 4582164
- Website: ddtonline.com

The Delta Democrat Times (sometimes spelled Delta Democrat-Times) is a daily newspaper that has been published in Greenville, Mississippi, United States since 1938, when Hodding Carter merged his Delta Star, which he started with his wife Betty Werlein in 1936, with the Democrat Times, which had been in publication since 1868, calling it the Greenville Delta Democrat-Times. The paper was home to Carter's editorial columns, which won a Pulitzer Prize in 1946. His son Hodding Carter, III, took control of the paper upon his death. The first black editor of the paper, Donald V. Adderton, took over in 2000 and served until 2004.

Though a Democratic newspaper, the Delta Democrat Times in 1963 endorsed the Republican gubernatorial nominee, Rubel Phillips, who lost to the Democrat Paul B. Johnson, Jr. Carter, Jr. wrote that "Democrats see clearly that the Republican Party, once it gains power in Mississippi, will offer the kind of effective outlet for the feelings of most Mississippians that the isolated state Democrats (who renounce any connection with the national party) can never hope to produce. All that the state Democratic Party can offer is another four years of frustrated political impotence in national affairs and a never-never land existence within the state's borders."

== See also ==
- Old Delta Democrat Times Building
