= Linden (Glen Allan, Mississippi) =

Historic house in Mississippi, United States

- U.S. National Register of Historic Places
- Location within Mississippi Location within the United States
- Location: One mile north of Glen Allan, Mississippi on county road 69
- Coordinates: 33°2′56″N 91°1′50″W
- Area: 4.9 acres (2.0 ha)
- Built: 1914
- Architect: Alger, E.N.; Davis, H.H.
- Architectural style: Colonial Revival
- NRHP reference No.: 82000581
- Added to NRHP: November 12, 1982

Linden is a historic mansion in Glen Allan, Mississippi.

== Location ==
It is located on Lake Washington road Glen Allan, Washington County, Mississippi.

== History ==
Originally, a mansion and plantation owned by Confederate General Wade Hampton III stood on this land. However, in 1914, P. L. Mann, a planter and politician, tore down the mansion to build a new house. It was designed by architects E. N. Alger and H. H. Davis in the Colonial Revival style.

It has been remodelled into a bed and breakfast for visitors known as Linden-on-the-Lake. The current owner is Nancy Bridges.

== Heritage significance ==
It has been listed on the National Register of Historic Places since November 12, 1982.
