= First National Bank of Greenville =

- U.S. National Register of Historic Places
- U.S. Historic district – Contributing property
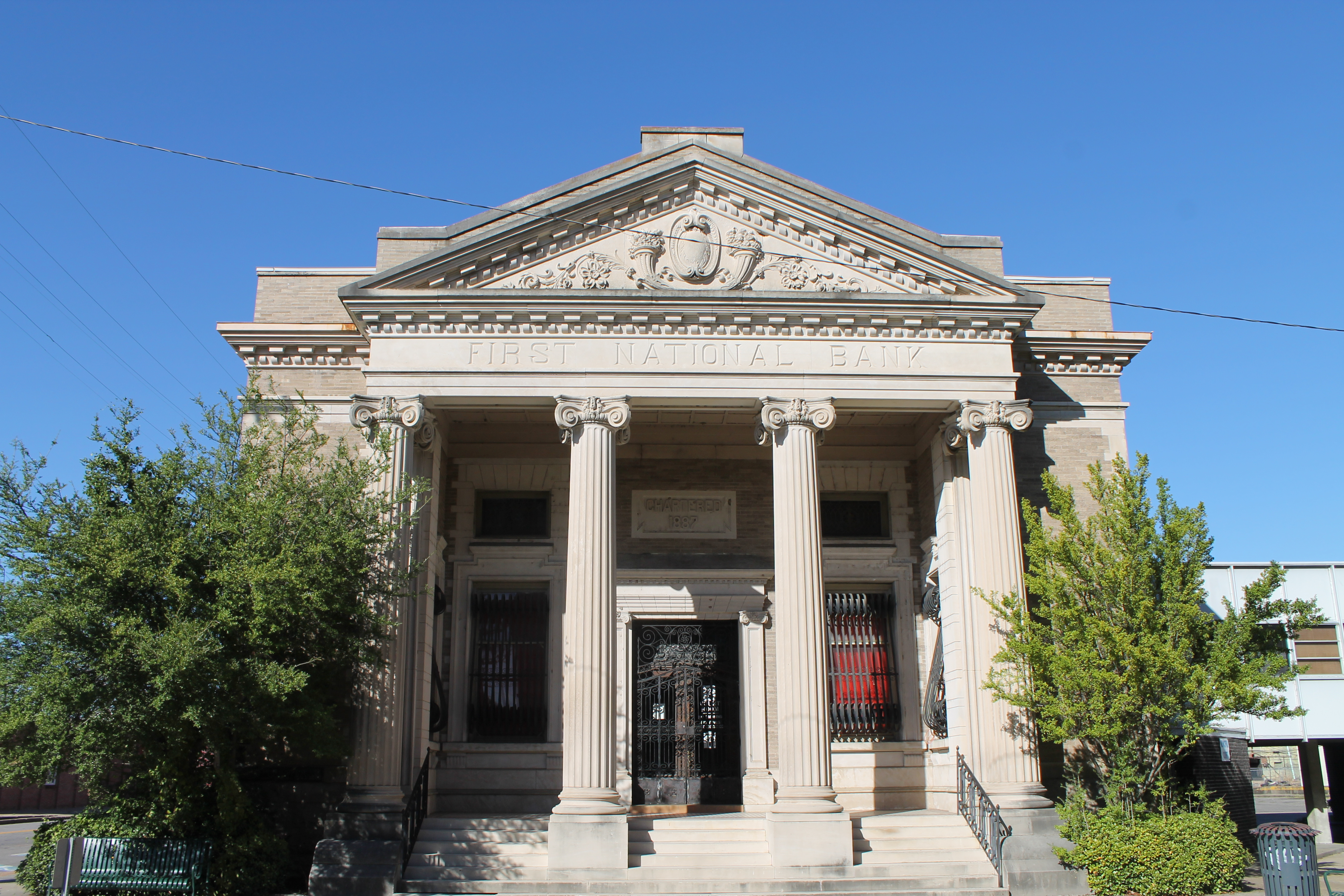

- Location within Mississippi Location within the United States
- Location: Main and S. Poplar Sts., Greenville, Mississippi
- Coordinates: 33°24′39″N 91°3′47″W
- Area: less than one acre
- Built: 1903
- Architect: Barber & Kluttz
- Architectural style: Classical Revival
- Part of: Greenville Commercial Historic District (ID97000235)
- NRHP reference No.: 78003195

Significant dates
- Added to NRHP: January 30, 1978
- Designated CP: October 10, 1997

The First National Bank of Greenville is a historic building in Greenville, Mississippi built in 1903. Since 1978, it has been on the U.S. National Register of Historic Places. Today, it is used as a public building for the Greenville Municipal Court.

== Location ==
The building is located at 302 Main Street in Greenville, Washington County, Mississippi.

== History ==
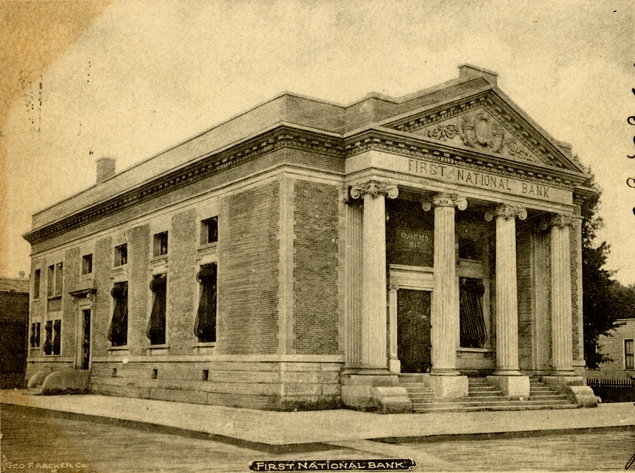
The building in the early 1900s

It was built in 1903 as the headquarters of the first bank chartered by the United States federal government in Washington County, Mississippi. It was designed in the Neoclassical architectural style by Knoxville, Tennessee architects Barber & Kluttz. It was established by James E. Negus, Jr., a Civil War veteran who had served in the Union Army and moved to Mississippi in 1870.

It is now used as a public building for the Greenville Municipal Court.

== Heritage significance ==
It has been listed on the National Register of Historic Places since January 30, 1978.

It was listed again on the National Register in 1997 as a contributing building in the Greenville Commercial Historic District.

== See also ==
- Bank of Washington in Greenville
- National Register of Historic Places listings in Washington County, Mississippi
