= Garden and Gun Club =

Private membership club and disco in Charleston, South Carolina

The Garden and Gun Club was a private-membership club and disco located in Charleston, South Carolina, that catered to a primarily gay clientele.

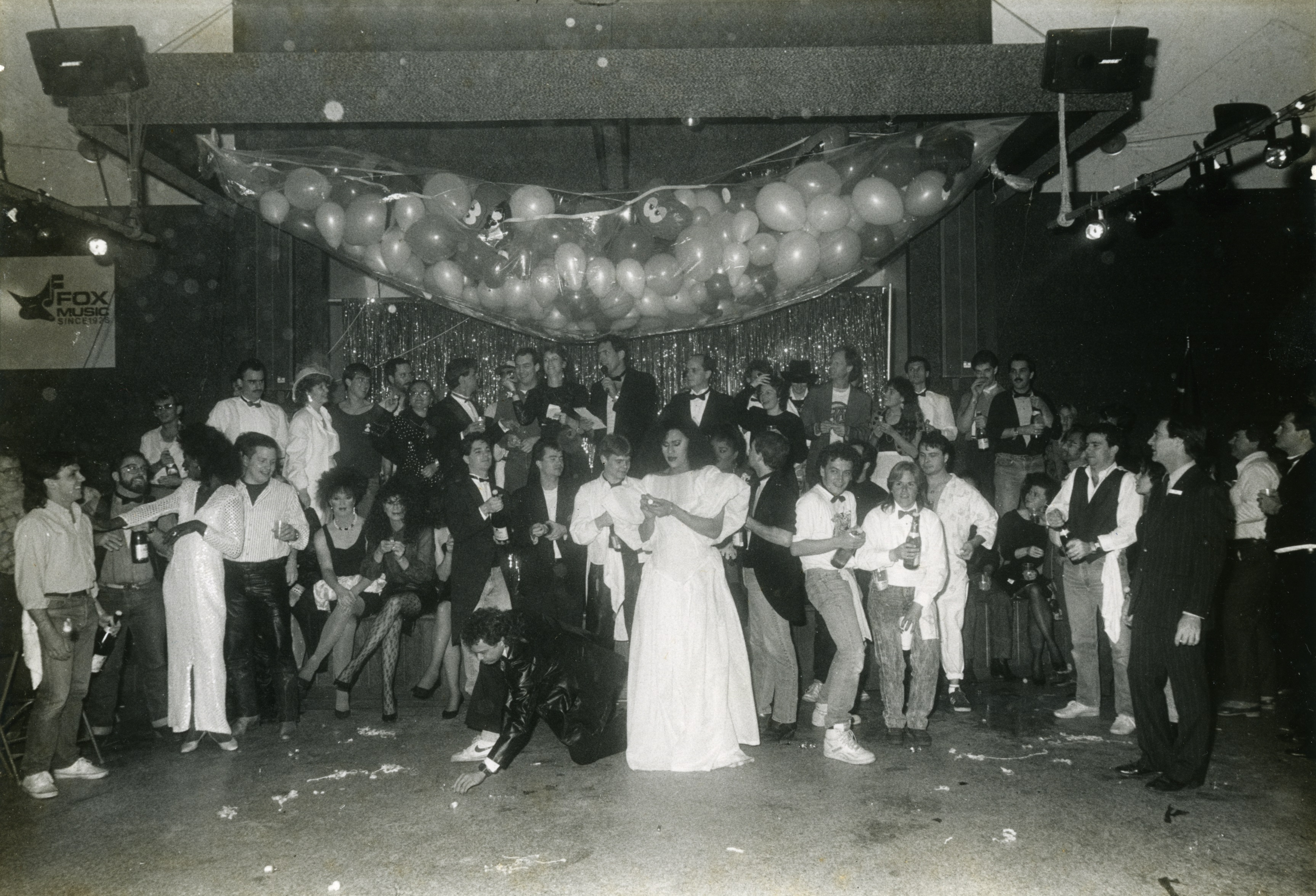
Photo of a party at the Garden & Gun Club

== History ==
Richard Robison started a bar for the Spoleto Festival in 1977 in a former J. C. Penney store at 240-242 King Street as a private club. More than 700 people paid $5 for memberships, and Robinson expressed interest in keeping the spot open beyond the Spoleto Festival. The bar, originally known as Spoleto Bar, was renamed the King Street Garden and Gun Club in 1978. After the success of the Spoleto Bar, the newly christened King Street Garden and Gun Club remained open year-round. In 1982, the club moved from King Street to 14 Hayne Street, before closing in 1985. The Garden and Gun club was well known in the city for its openness, breaking down barriers and allowing people of different classes and identities to mingle. All members were required to agree to membership rules which began "This is a mixed club".

Southern lifestyle magazine Garden & Gun was named in reference to the club. The group also operates a Garden & Gun Club in Atlanta, Georgia. Unlike its namesake, it is not a disco or gay club.
