= Mary M. Purser =

American artist

- Born: 1913; Chicago Illinois
- Died: 1986 (aged 72–73); Alachua, Florida
- Known for: muralist
- Spouse: Stuart R. Purser

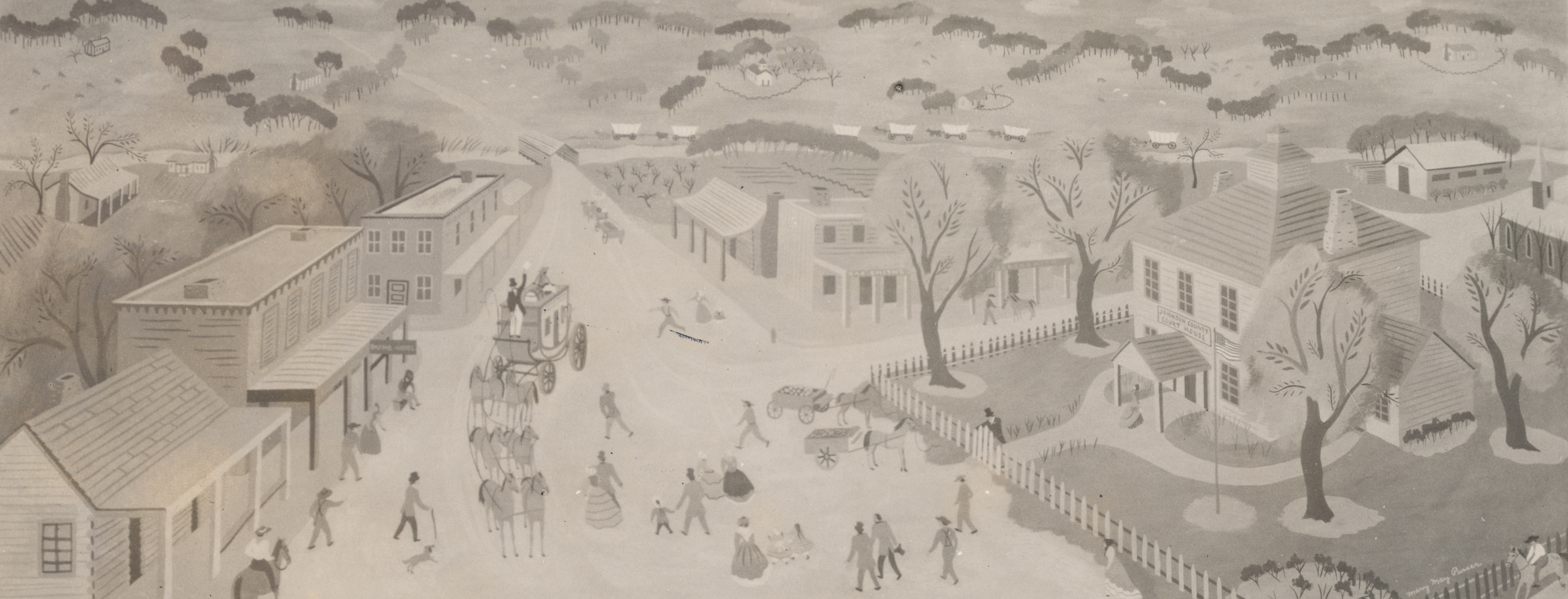
How Happy was the Occasion Clarksville, Arkansas Post Office

Mary May Purser (1913 - 1986) was an American painter. She is best known for her New Deal era mural in the Clarksville, Arkansas Post Office.

== Biography ==
Purser nee was born on August 16, 1901, in Chicago, Illinois. She attended the School of the Art Institute of Chicago. She married fellow artist Stuart R. Purser (1907 - 1986) with whom she had two children. Purser never graduated from the Art Institute, leaving at the time of her marriage, but she eventually earned a B.A. from the University of Mississippi, then an MFA from the University of Florida.

The Pursers moved several times as Stuart pursued his teaching career. They lived in Washington, Louisiana, Mississippi, Tennessee, and Florida, with Stuart serving as the head of the department of art at University of Florida. Mary taught for a time at the University of Tennessee at Chattanooga when the family resided there.

In 1939 Purser completed the oil-on-canvas mural How Happy Was the Occasion for the Clarksville, Arkansas Post Office. The mural was funded by the Treasury Section of Fine Arts (TSFA) and Purser received payment of $470.

She died in 1986 in Alachua, Florida.
