= United States Post Office (Leland, Mississippi) =

- U.S. Post Office
- U.S. National Register of Historic Places
- U.S. Historic district – Contributing property
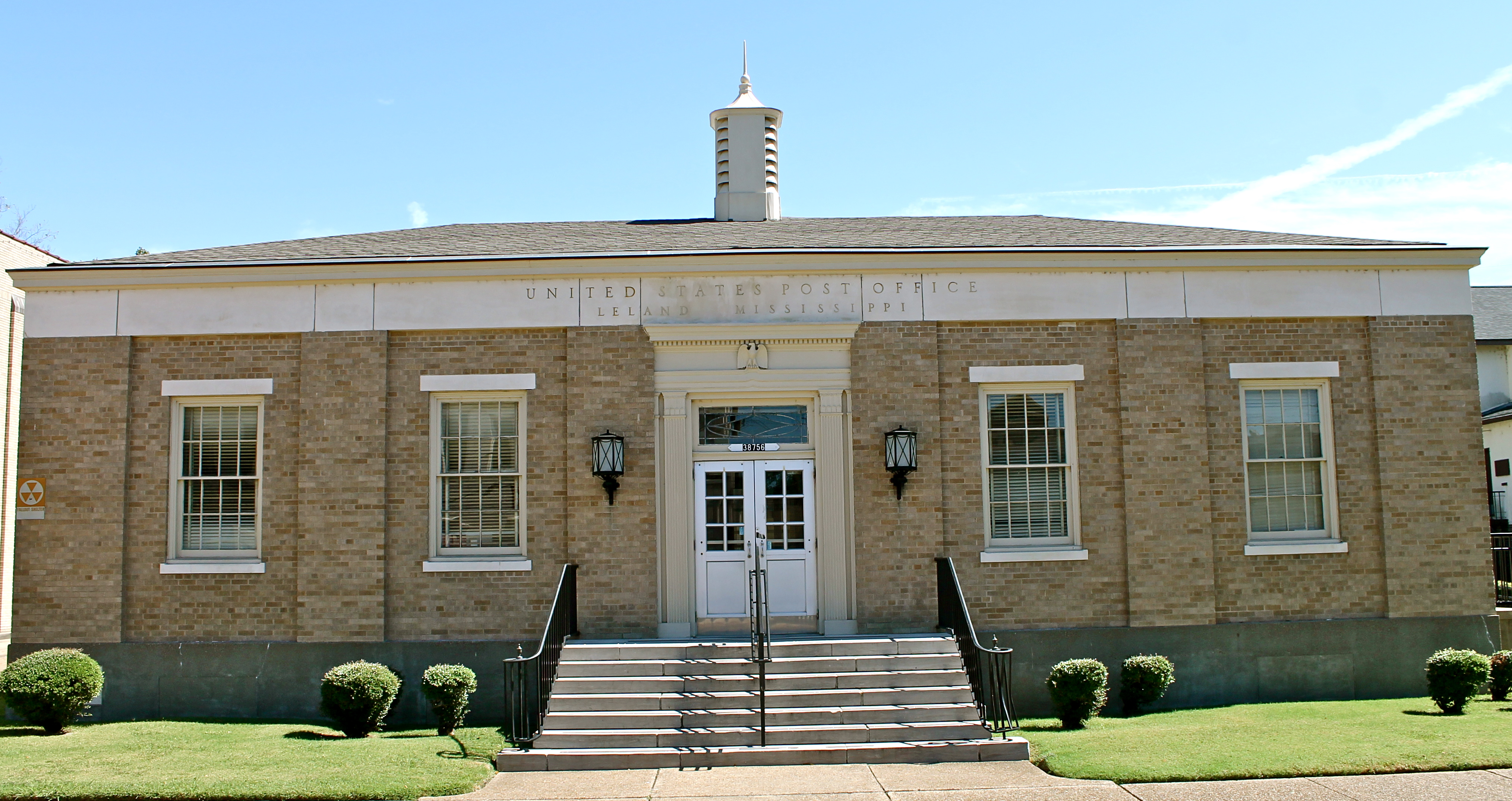
- The U.S. Post Office in 2013

- Location within Mississippi Location within the United States
- Location: 204 North Broad Street, Leland, Mississippi
- Coordinates: 33.4047°N 90.8980°W
- Built: 1938
- Architectural style: Colonial Revival
- Part of: Leland Historic District (ID04001144)
- NRHP reference No.: 83000969

Significant dates
- Added to NRHP: April 21, 1983
- Designated CP: October 12, 2004

The U.S. Post Office is a historic building in Leland, Mississippi, United States.

== Location ==
The building is located at 204 North Broad Street in Leland, a small town in Washington County, Mississippi.

== History ==
The building was completed in 1938. It was designed in the Colonial Revival architectural style. In 1940, Stuart R. Purser painted a mural inside the building.

== Architectural significance ==
It has been listed on the National Register of Historic Places since April 21, 1983.
