= Bank of Washington =

- U.S. National Register of Historic Places
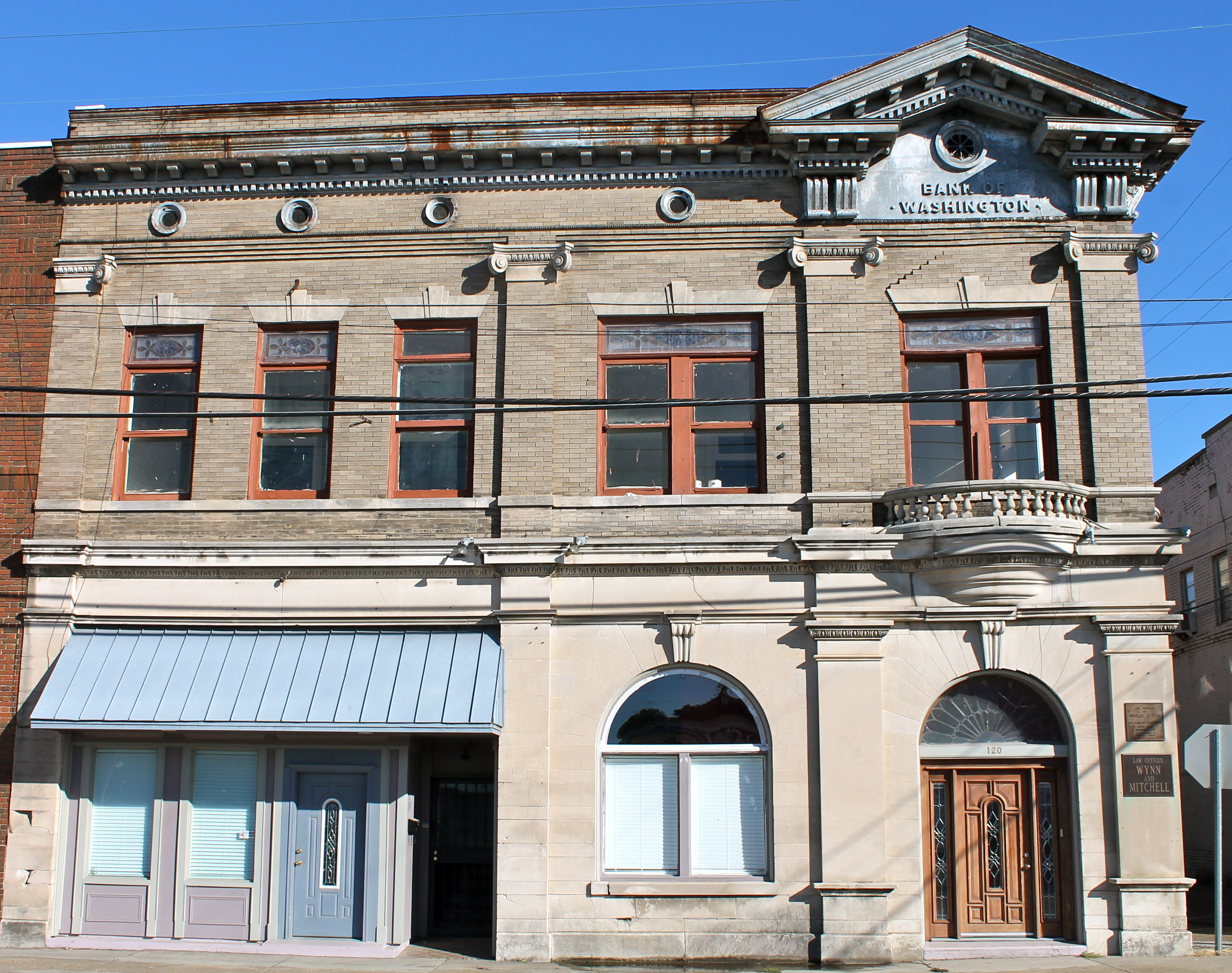
- The Bank of Washington in 2013

- Location within Mississippi Location within the United States
- Location: 120 S. Poplar Street, Greenville, Mississippi, U.S.
- Coordinates: 33°24′41.9″N 91°3′45.8″W
- Area: less than one acre
- Built: 1903
- Architectural style: Beaux Arts
- NRHP reference No.: 87001209
- Added to NRHP: July 16, 1987

The Bank of Washington is a historic building in Greenville, Mississippi, USA.

== Location ==
The building is located at 120 South Poplar Street in Downtown Greenville, the county seat of Washington County, Mississippi, in the Southern United States.

== History ==
The two-storey building was completed in 1903. It was designed in the Beaux-Arts architectural style. It was home to the Bank of Washington from 1903 to 1914.

Later, it was home to a cotton brokerage firm and a radio. It has been home to offices since 1974.

== Architectural significance ==
It has been listed on the National Register of Historic Places since July 16, 1987.

== See also ==
- First National Bank of Greenville
- National Register of Historic Places listings in Washington County, Mississippi
