= Armitage Herschell Carousel =

Restored antique carousel in Greenville, Mississippi

- U.S. National Register of Historic Places
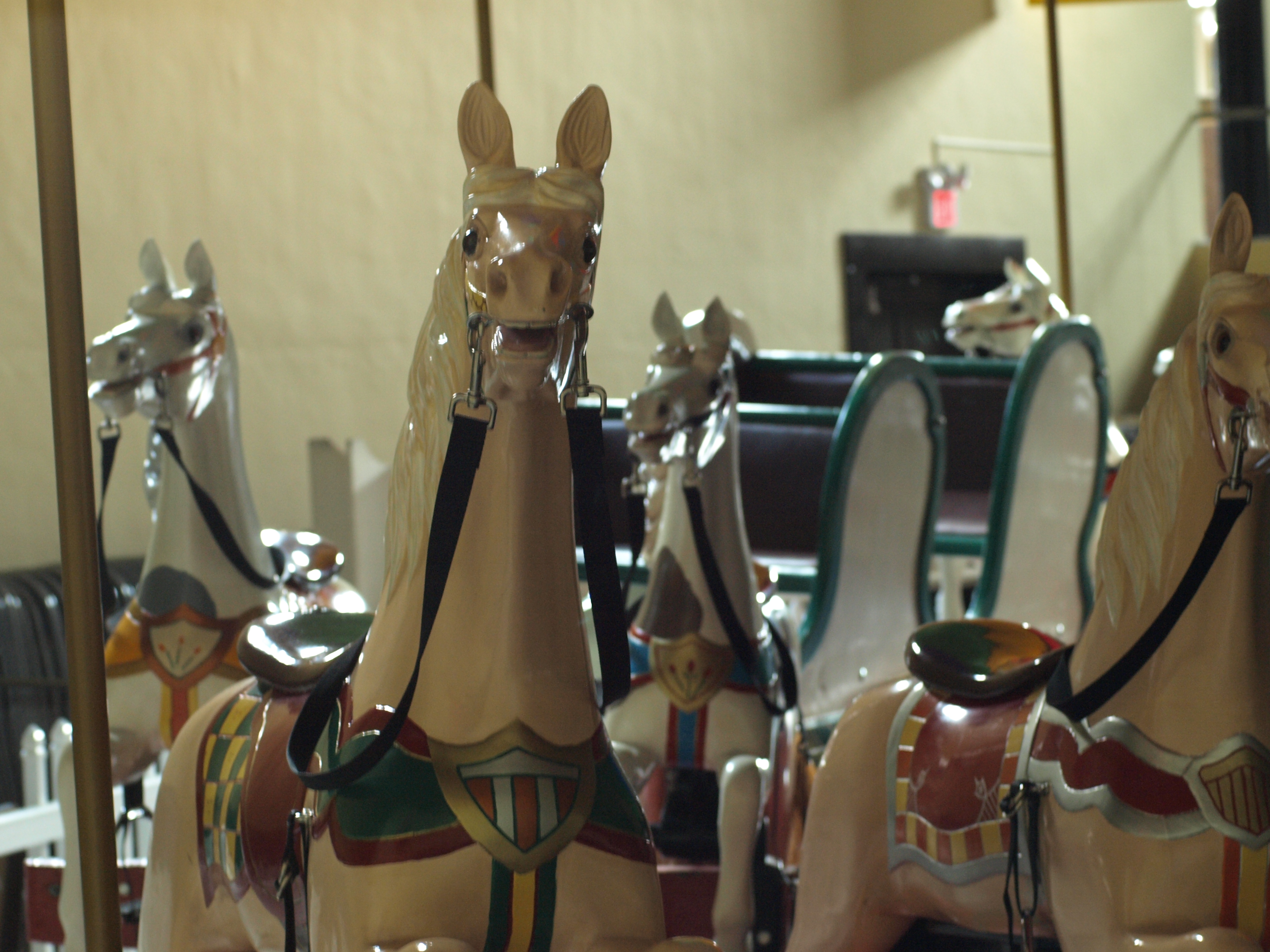
- Location: Greenville, Mississippi
- Coordinates: 33.4042°N 91.0538°W
- Built: 1901
- NRHP reference No.: 12000155
- Added to NRHP: March 28, 2012

The Armitage Herschell Carousel is an antique carousel in the E.E. Bass Cultural Arts Center in Greenville, Mississippi. It was built in 1901 and was added to the National Register of Historic Places in 2012.

== See also ==
- Amusement rides on the National Register of Historic Places
- National Register of Historic Places listings in Washington County, Mississippi
