= Clarke Reed =

American businessman and politician (1928–2024)

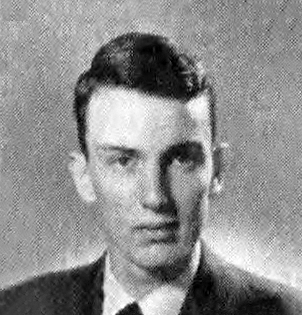
- Reed in 1948

Chairman of the Mississippi Republican Party
- In office 1966–1976
- Preceded by: Wirt Yerger
- Succeeded by: Charles W. Pickering

Personal details
- Born: Clarke Thomas Reed Sr. August 4, 1928 Alliance, Ohio, U.S.
- Died: December 8, 2024 (aged 96) Greenville, Mississippi, U.S.
- Party: Republican
- Spouse: Julia Brooks (m. 1957)
- Children: 3; including Julia Evans
- Education: University of Missouri
- Occupation: Businessman, politician

Clarke Thomas Reed Sr. (August 4, 1928 – December 8, 2024) was an American businessman and politician. He served as Chairman of the Mississippi Republican Party from 1966 to 1976. Prior to his political career, Reed was an agricultural businessman and a graduate in economics.

Reed was widely credited for strengthening the Republican Party's influence and eventual dominance in the Southern United States. He was also noted for his support of President Gerald Ford during the 1976 Republican National Convention, which played a role in the defeat of then-Governor Ronald Reagan's candidacy for the Republican nomination.

== Early life ==
Clarke Thomas Reed was born in Alliance, Ohio, on August 4, 1928. He was raised in Caruthersville, Missouri. He graduated with a degree in economics from the University of Missouri in 1950, and then spent two years in the United States Air Force. His study of economics was primarily influenced by conservative thinkers such as Adam Smith, Edmund Burke, William F. Buckley Jr. and Milton Friedman.

After college, Reed founded a company that provided agricultural equipment to local farmers. He would eventually specialize in devices that kept birds away from farms and airfields.

Reed was raised in a Democratic household, but he cast his first presidential vote, in 1952, for Dwight D. Eisenhower.

== Chair of the Mississippi Republican Party ==
Reed became the state party chairman of the Mississippi Republican Party in 1966. He later became the head of the Southern Republican Chairmen's Association, making him a vocal figure in the party's progress across the region.

Reed was identified with the Southern Strategy, which saw the Solid South shift politically from Democratic to Republican. He was credited for unifying the Southern United States GOP Convention delegates to vote for Richard Nixon in 1968. As a result, during his presidency Nixon would consult with Reed concerning matters of importance to the South.

As state chairman, he focused on local elections. In 1969, Mississippi Republicans won nine mayoral races. In 1972, two of the party's congressional candidates, the future senators Thad Cochran and Trent Lott, became the first Mississippi Republicans elected to Congress since Reconstruction. In an interview with The New York Times in 1976, Reed said that he wanted the national Republican Party to be fiscally and socially conservative.

=== 1976 Republican National Convention ===
Reed was instrumental in the nomination of U.S. President Gerald Ford at the 1976 Republican National Convention, held in Kansas City, Missouri. Then–Chief of Staff Dick Cheney said that Reed was dissatisfied with then-former Governor Ronald Reagan and his running mate pick, U.S. Senator Richard Schweiker. Schweiker was a liberal Republican from a state whose delegation could be crucial at the convention. Reed threw his support behind Ford and, in doing so, stopped Reagan's momentum at the convention, permitting Ford to win the nomination.

His decision to endorse Ford over Reagan drew criticism from hardliners within his party. Following the convention, he stepped down as party chair. Afterwards, Reed and Reagan made amends, with Reed expressing regrets over going against Reagan.

== Later career ==
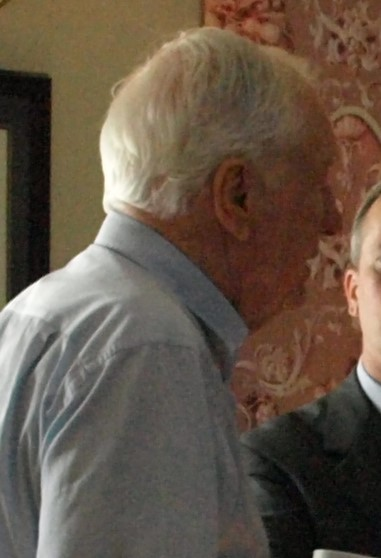
Reed in 2010

In his later years, Reed caucused for several Republican politicians. He was noted for hosting political events and fundraisers for local and state politicians at the Doe's Eat Place in Greenville, Mississippi.

Reed was critical of the Republican Party during the 2016 presidential election and of eventual President Donald Trump. In 2015, he endorsed his first Democratic political candidate, Tom Blanton, for Southern District of the Public Service Commission.

Karl Rove, former advisor to President George W. Bush, noted that "President, senators, congressmen, and governors depended on [Reed] for counsel and leadership" while also calling him a "political pioneer". He was often called a "patriarch" of the Republican Party.

== Personal life ==
In 1957, Reed married Julia Brooks. They had three children: Clarke Jr., Reynolds, and writer Julia Evans Reed. Two of his children predeceased him: Reynolds in 2019 and Julia Evans in 2020.

In June 2010, Reed was involved in a vehicular crash, which resulted in the death of another man in Greenville. Reed himself was injured and hospitalized in Jackson, Mississippi.

Reed died at his home in Greenville on December 8, 2024, from complications of pneumonia, at the age of 96.

Political offices
Preceded by Wirt Yerger	Chairman of the Mississippi Republican Party; 1966–1976	Succeeded by Charles W. Pickering
