= Old Delta Democrat Times Building =

- U.S. National Register of Historic Places
- U.S. Historic district – Contributing property
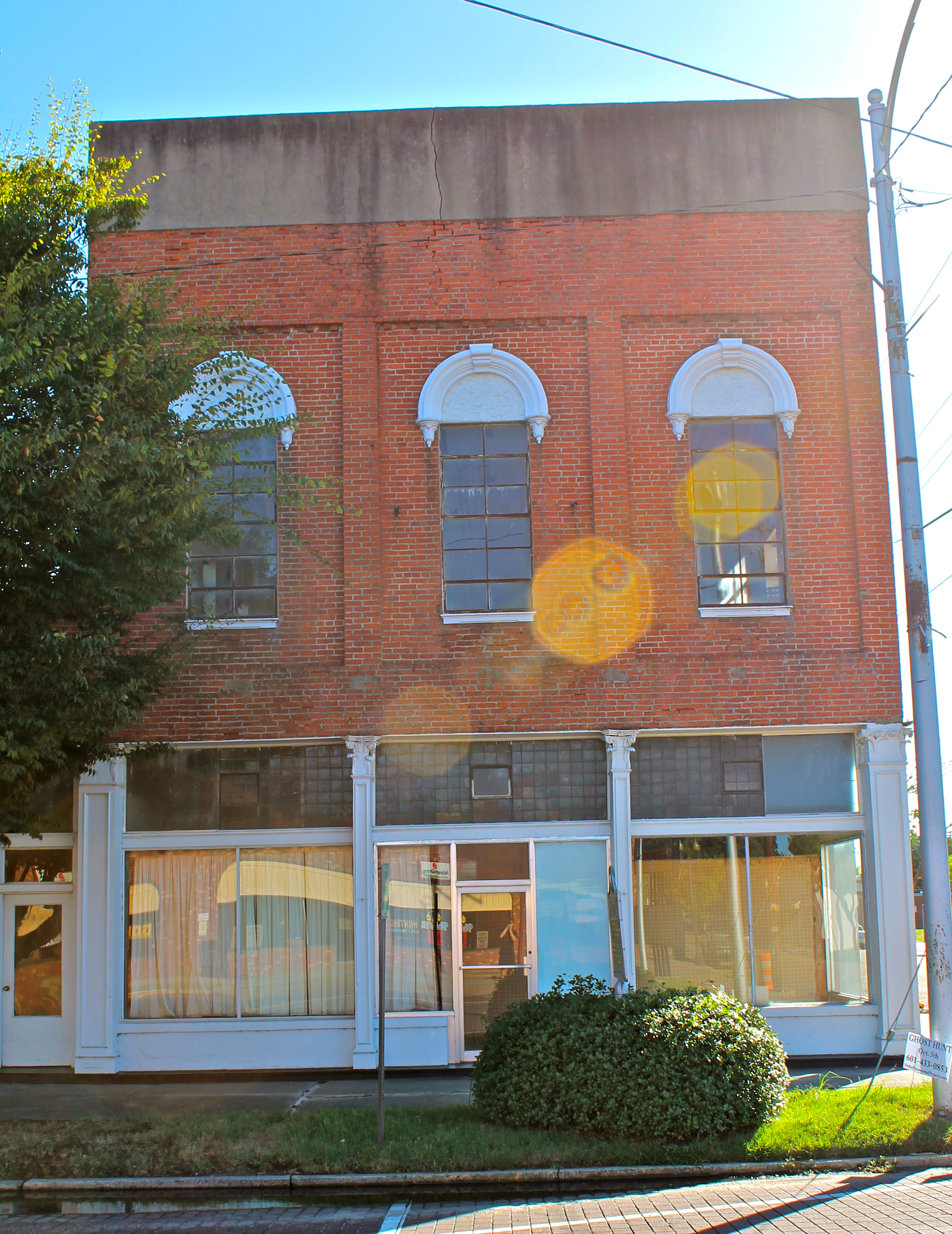
- The Old Delta Democrat Times Building in 2013
- Interactive map of Old Delta Democrat Times Building
- Location: 201-203 Main Street, Greenville, Mississippi, U.S.
- Built: c. 1880-1882
- Part of: Greenville Commercial Historic District (ID97000235)
- NRHP reference No.: 82003120

Significant dates
- Added to NRHP: March 25, 1982
- Designated CP: October 10, 1997

The Old Delta Democrat Times Building is a historic building in Greenville, in the state of Mississippi in the Southern United States.

== Location ==
The building is located at 201-203 Main Street in Downtown Greenville, the county seat of Washington County, Mississippi, in the Southern United States.

== History ==
The two-storey building was completed circa 1880–1882. It was acquired in 1880 for US$700 by John G. Arche and Samuel Brown, the owners of Brown & Arche, a mill and machine company. It was sold to the Lake family in 1902, who remained the owners until 1977.

The second floor was rented to the Greenville Temple Association, a Freemason lodge, from 1883 to 1914. The first floor was rented to the Greenville Bank and Trust Company from 1906 to 1910. From 1943 to 1968, the building was rented by the Delta Democrat Times. Later, it was rented to the Mississippi Industries for the Blind.

== Heritage significance ==
It has been listed on the National Register of Historic Places since March 25, 1982.
