= Belmont Plantation (Wayside, Mississippi) =

Historic house in Mississippi, United States

- U.S. National Register of Historic Places
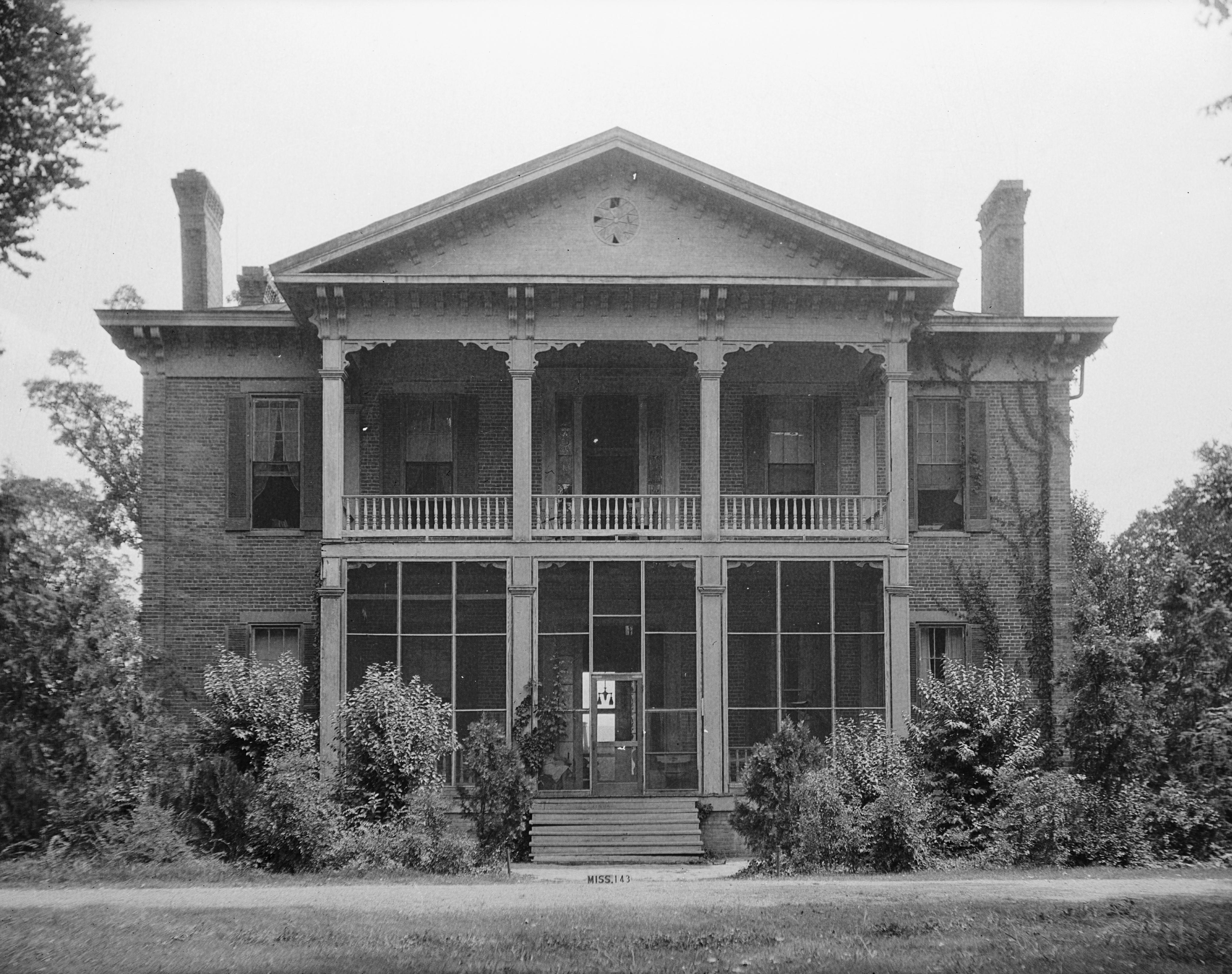

- Location within Mississippi Location within the United States
- Location: Jct. of MS 1 and 438, Wayside, Mississippi
- Coordinates: 33°16′9″N 91°1′59″W
- Area: 6.4 acres (2.6 ha)
- Built: 1857
- NRHP reference No.: 72000702
- Added to NRHP: April 11, 1972

Belmont Plantation is an Antebellum plantation in Wayside, Washington County, Mississippi.

== History ==
The mansion was built in 1857 by W.W. Worthington. It was raided by Union forces in 1863, in the midst of the American Civil War of 1861–1865.

It was turned into the Belmont Hunting Lodge by Mississippi Governor Dennis Murphree in 1946.

It is a wedding & event space, luxury hunting lodge, and bed & breakfast.

== Heritage significance ==
It has been listed on the National Register of Historic Places since April 11, 1972.
