= Wayside, Mississippi =

- Unincorporated community
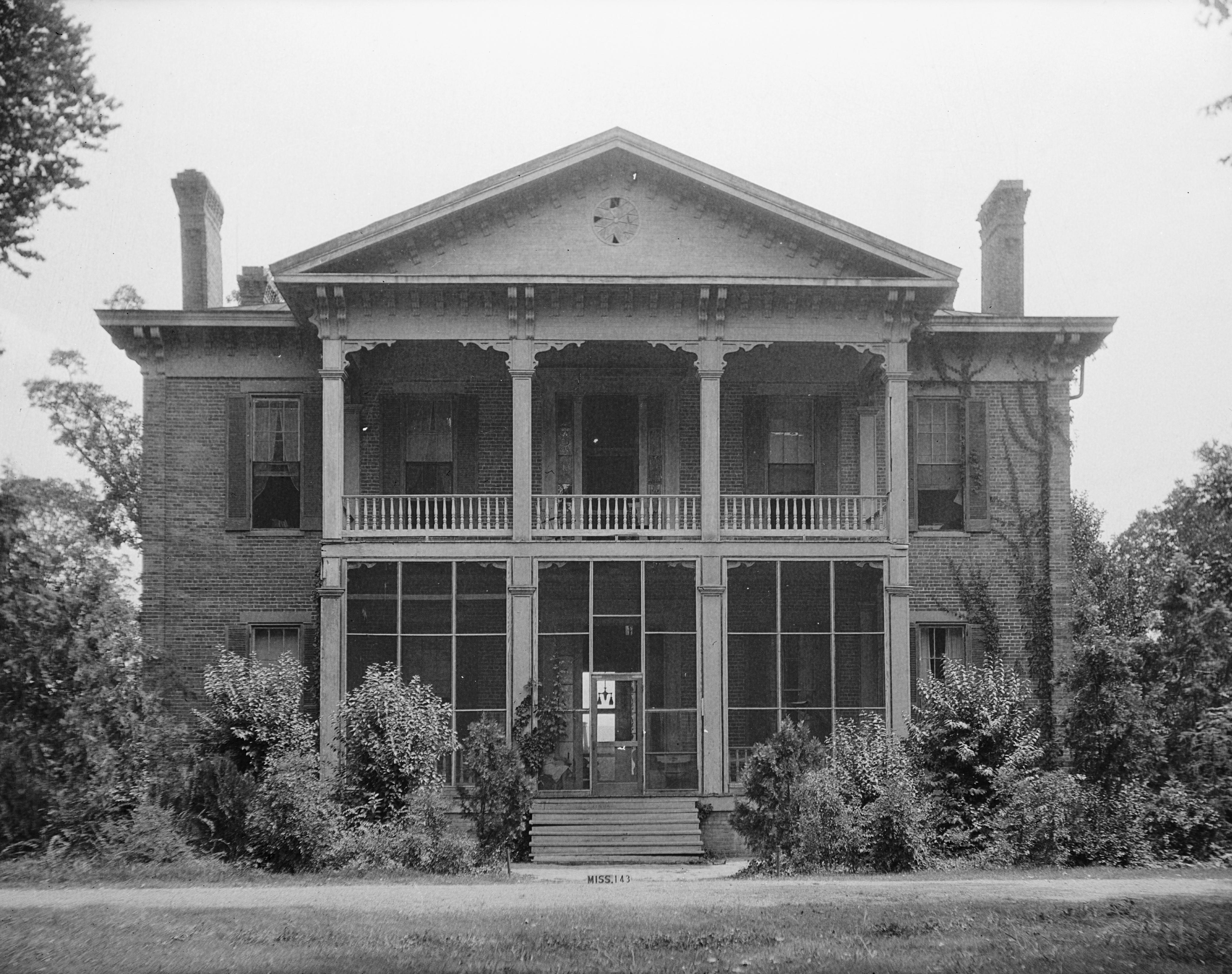
- Belmont Plantation in Wayside is listed on the National Register of Historic Places

- Location within Mississippi
- Coordinates: Mississippi#USA 33°16′08″N 91°02′01″W
- Country: United States
- State: Mississippi
- County: Washington
- Elevation: 121 ft (37 m)
- Time zone: UTC-6 (Central (CST))
  - Summer (DST): UTC-5 (CDT)
- ZIP code: 38780
- Area code: 662
- GNIS feature ID: 679401

Wayside is an unincorporated community in Washington County, Mississippi, United States.

The settlement has a post office and water tower. Wayside is located on Mississippi Highway 1 approximately 8 mi (13 km) south of Greenville.

== History ==
The Belmont Plantation was located in Wayside. The plantation home was completed in 1859, and has been described as "one of the few antebellum homes in the region not burned by rampaging Union soldiers". The extant home was placed on the National Register of Historic Places in 1972.

Wayside was originally located directly on the Mississippi River at the eastern end of "American Bend", and the early settlement had a steamboat landing. The river changed course following a flood in 1858, cutting off the bend and creating an oxbow lake now called Lake Lee.

A branch of the Louisville, New Orleans and Texas Railway, completed in the late 1880s, passed through Wayside.

In 1900, the population was 65.

On October 9, 2009, a tornado destroyed three mobile homes, damaged 16 houses and knocked down trees. A fatality occurred in a mobile home, and two others were injured.

== Gallery ==
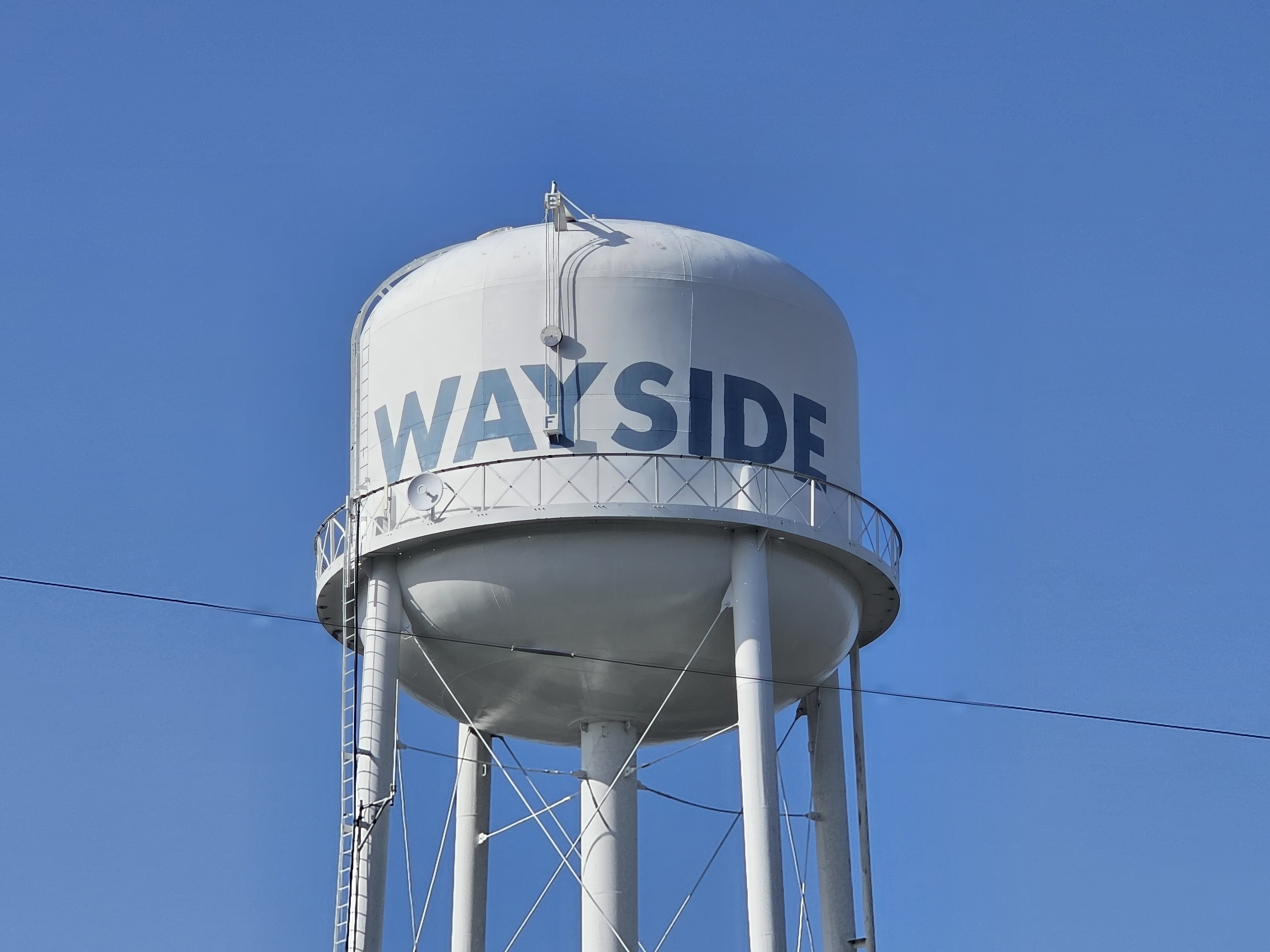
Wayside Water Tower
