= American College of the Building Arts =

College in Charleston, South Carolina

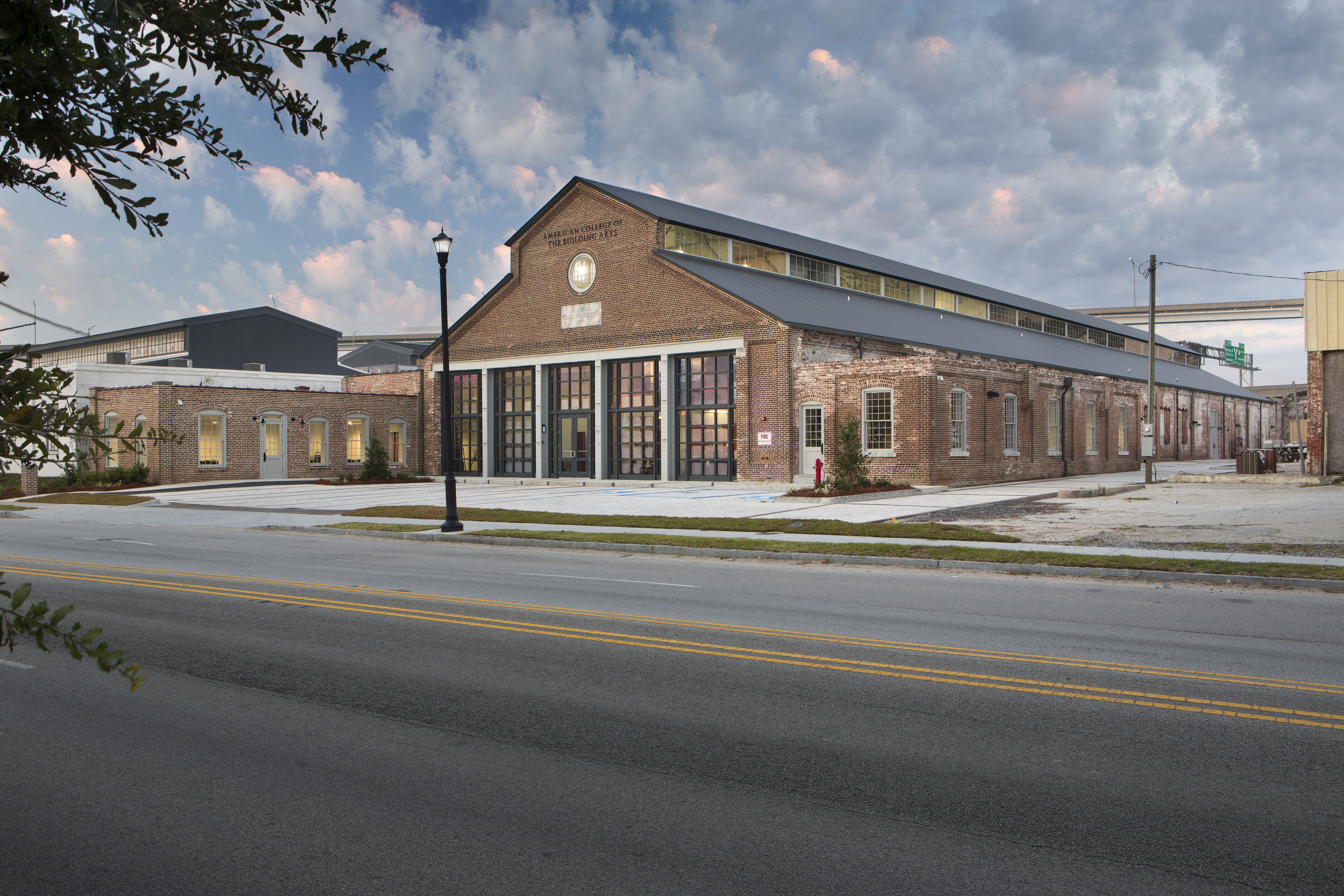
- Motto: Aut disce Aut discede
- Motto in English: Learn or Leave
- Type: Private Liberal Arts College
- Established: 2004
- Academic affiliations: SCCHE
- President: Colby M. Broadwater III
- Academic staff: 22
- Administrative staff: 9
- Location: Charleston, South Carolina, U.S. 32.7785°N 79.9372°W
- Campus: Old Trolley Barn
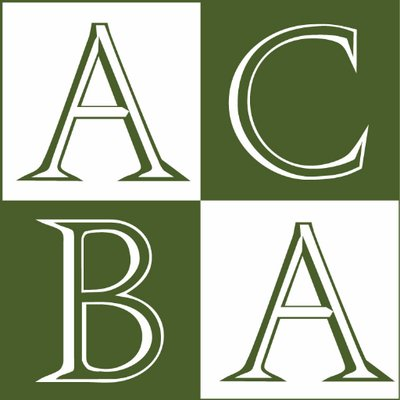

American College of the Building Arts (ACBA) is a private, four-year liberal arts and sciences college located in Charleston, South Carolina, United States. It is licensed by the South Carolina Commission on Higher Education to grant a Bachelor of Applied Science and an Associate of Applied Science in six craft specializations in the building arts.

The college's model focuses on total integration of a liberal arts and science education and the traditional building arts skills. Students choose from among six craft specializations: timber framing, architectural carpentry, plaster, classical architecture, blacksmithing and stone carving.

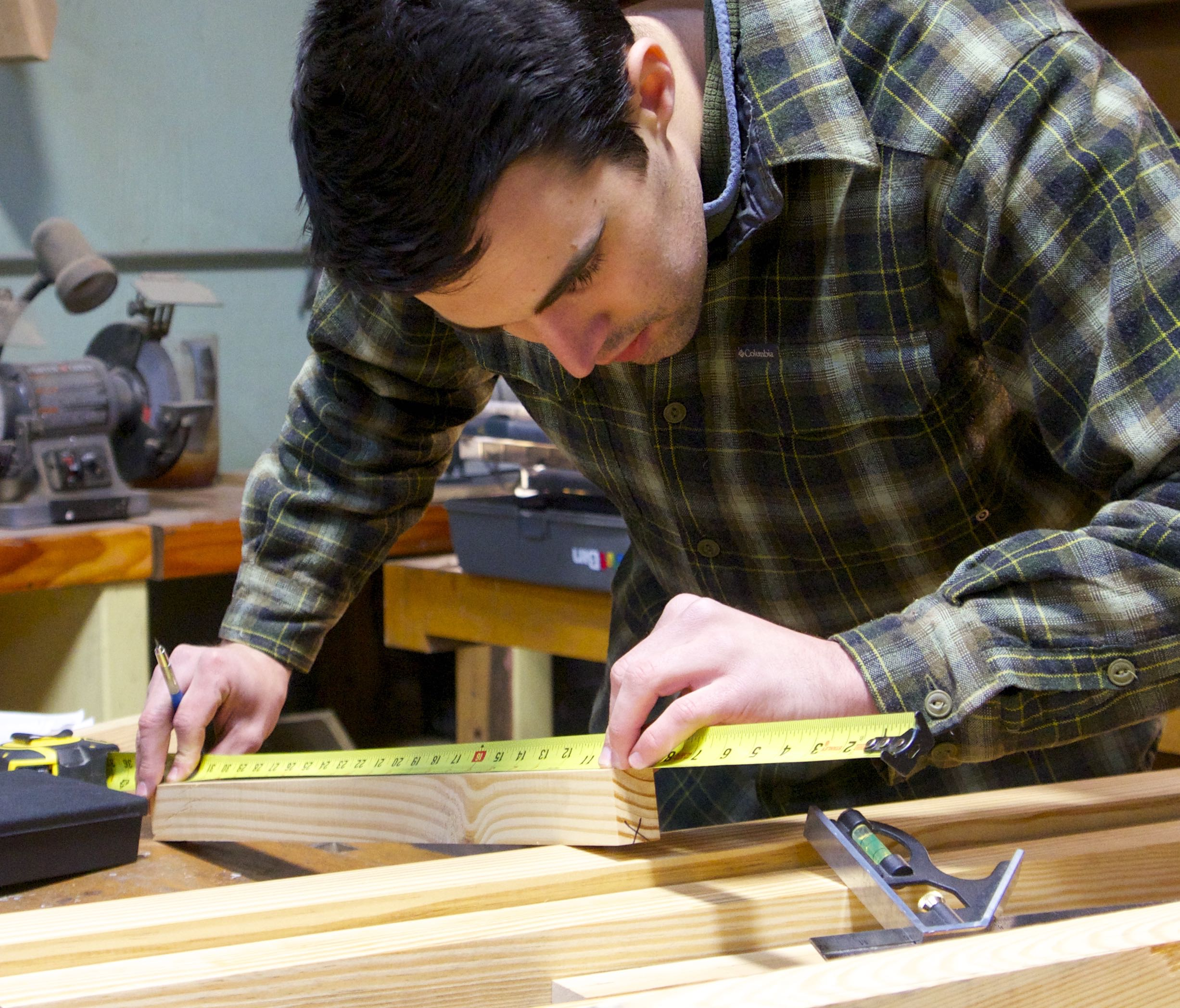
American College of the Building Arts junior measuring for a custom stair

Current students come from more than 30 states. One quarter of the student body is female and one fifth are veterans. The majority of students have secured employment in their respective trades prior to graduation.

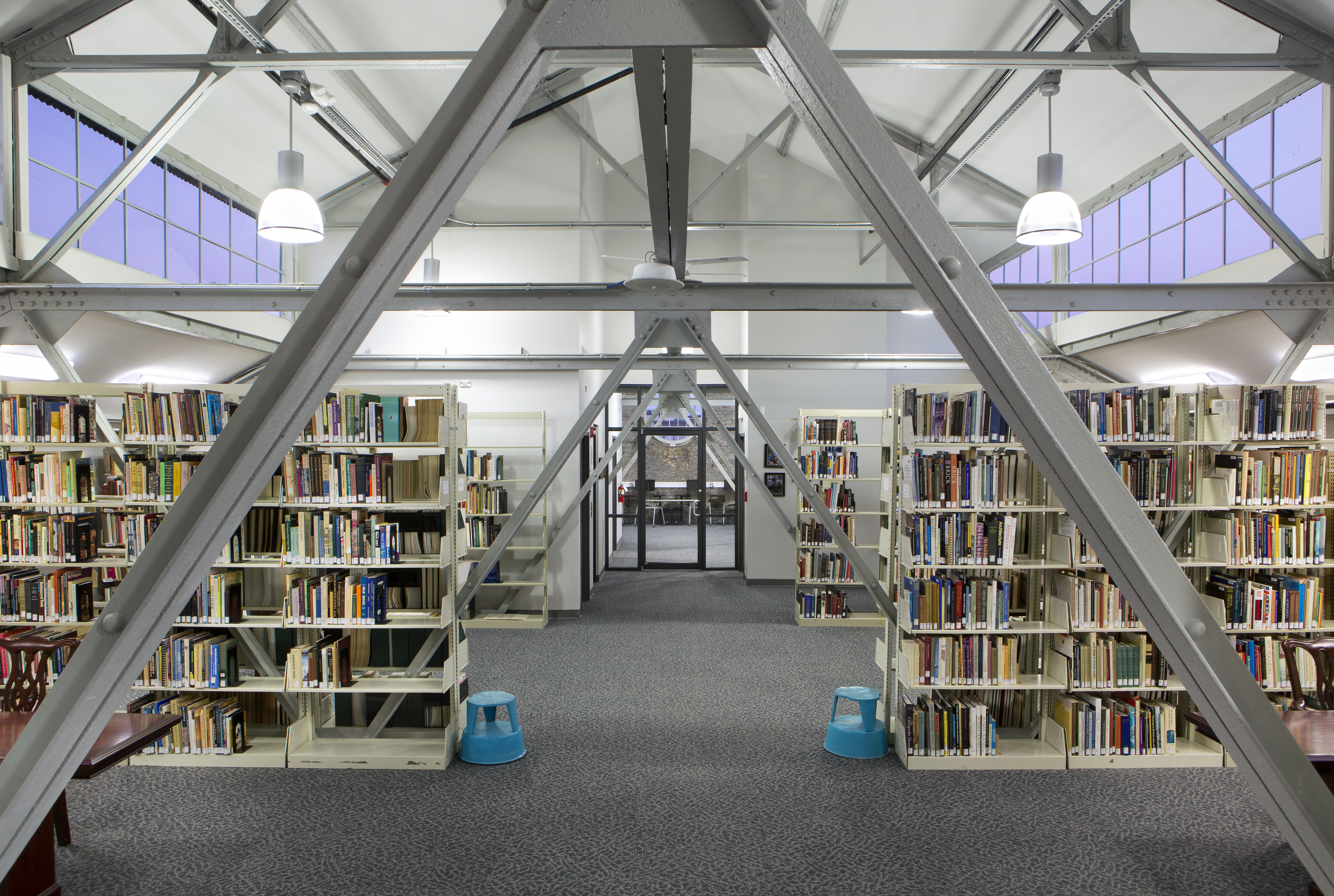
American College of the Building Arts library interior

== Academics ==
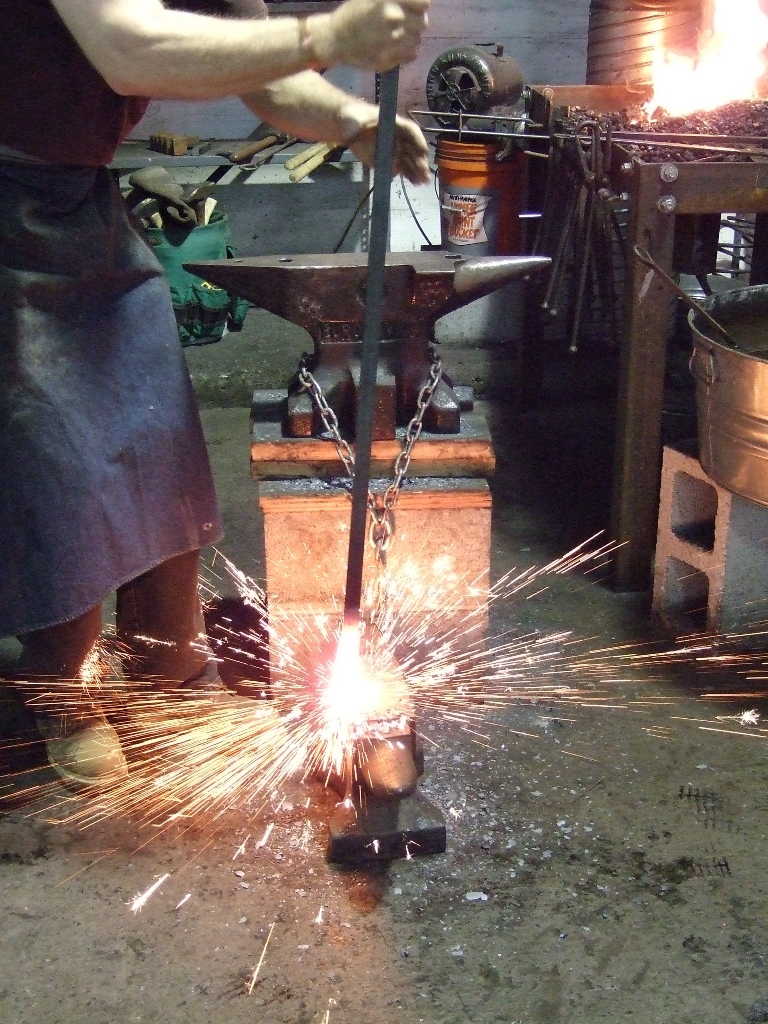
Student at the American College of the Building Arts working with steel

American College of the Building Arts combines a traditional liberal arts education with programs in trade education that are based on European and other models. The framing and plaster programs are based on the French “les Compagnons du Devoir,” a trade guild offering high-skill vocational and educational training rich in culture and humanity. The stone program is based on programs at Lincoln Cathedral and Wells Cathedral in the United Kingdom. The iron program has a long association with Colonial Williamsburg and also with the work of Philip Simmons, famed Charleston ironwork artisan and one of the founders of ACBA. Pieces designed and made by Simmons are displayed at the Smithsonian Institution, South Carolina State Museum and outside the United States in France and China. In addition to trade-specific classes, students pursue a course of general studies that includes not only typical college courses, such as English and mathematics, but also specialized courses in drawing, design, materials science and construction management. ACBA maintains a low student-to-faculty ratio to ensure the highest standards of quality in its programs.

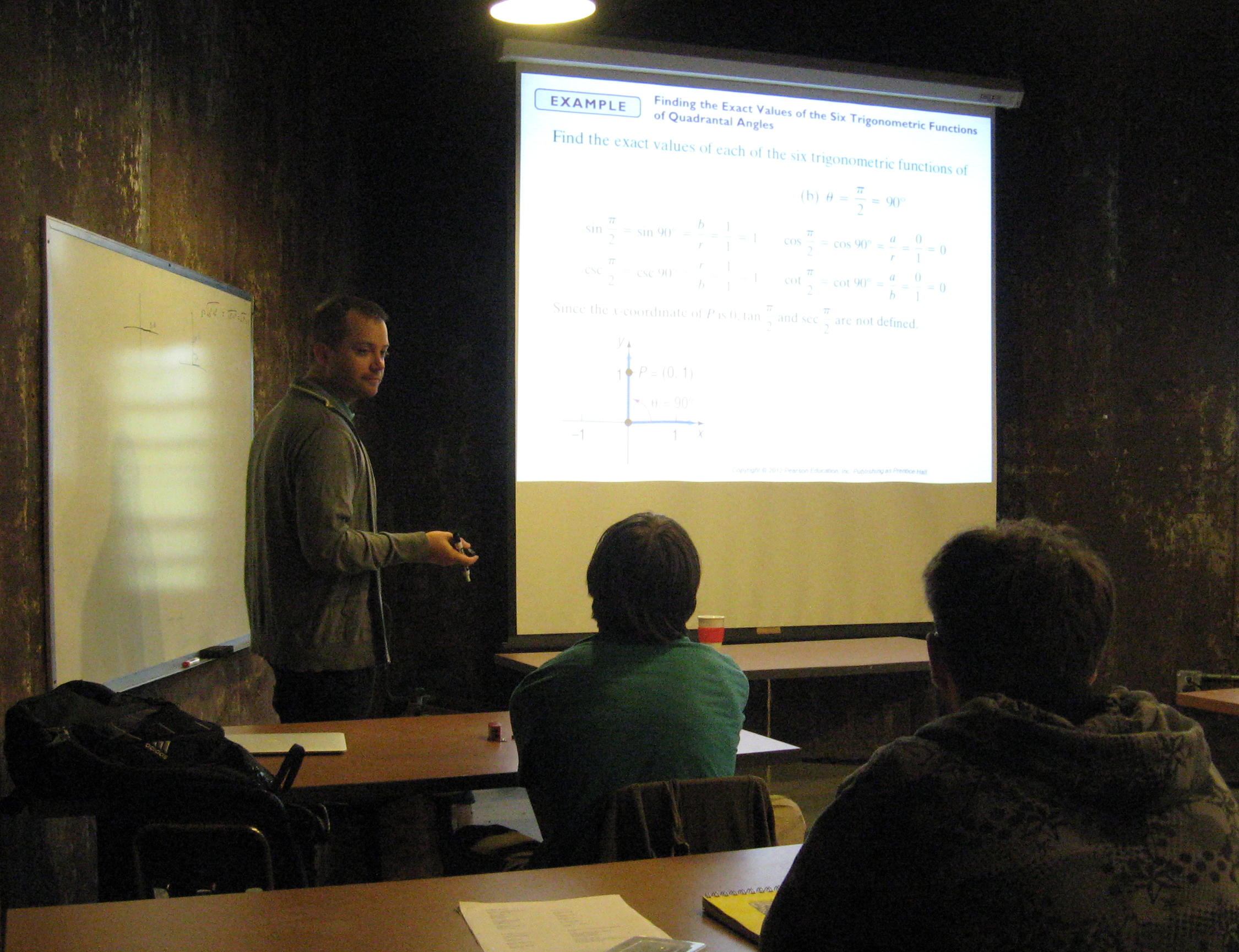
American College of the Building Arts freshman math class

The Byrne-Diderot Library is a major research resource for students and faculty. The library houses a specialized collection of books, periodicals, newspapers and audiovisual materials in the building, visual, decorative and liberal arts. The library's main collection contains over 6.500 items. The D.A.R. Special Collections room contains another 500 rare books, catalogs and periodicals, as well as examples of historical tools and 19th century Charleston iron work.

In 2019 the founding Dean Simeon A. Warren was awarded the Elizabeth O'Neill Verner Governor's award in recognition of outstanding contributions to the arts in South Carolina in the category of Art's Education. In 2020 the board formally recognized Warren as Dean Emeritus.

== Media ==
ACBA has been featured on This Old House, Forbes, Garden & Gun, Voice of America, Worth, Wolverine Boots, White House Chronicle, and PBS NewsHour

== Campus history ==
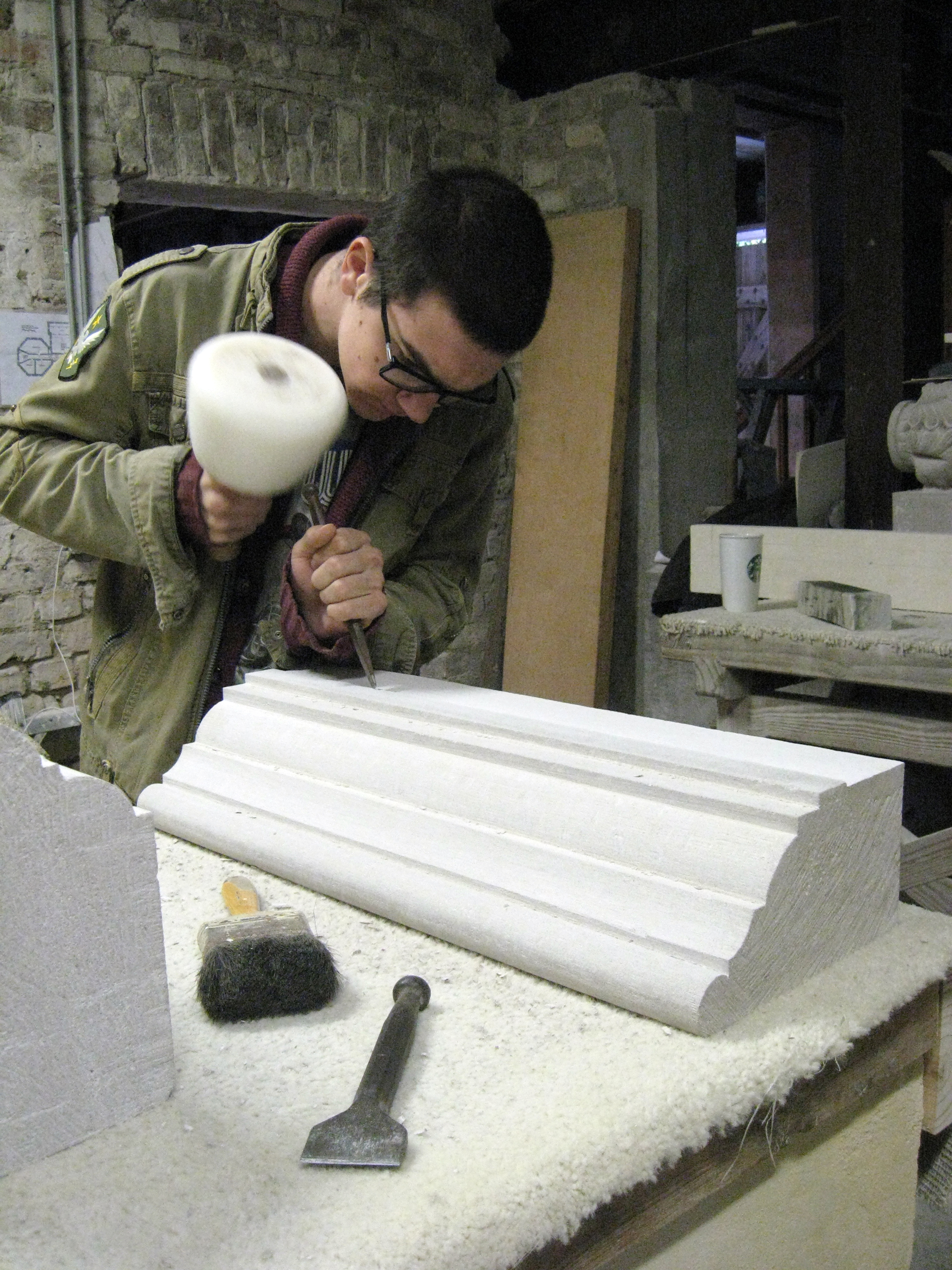
American College of the Building Arts junior carving a stone mantle

American College of the Building Arts first classes were offered at several locations in and around the city of Charleston, including the Old Charleston District Jail, which became the college's primary location for 17 years. Carpentry and forged architectural iron programs were housed at a separate site. The Jail was originally constructed in 1802 and expanded in 1855 to include living quarters for the warden and jailers on the street side and an octagonal rear wing. Many infamous inmates were housed in the prison, including high seas pirates, the female mass murderer Lavinia Fischer and Denmark Vesey, a free African American who plotted a slave rebellion that was discovered before it could be executed. During the Civil War both Confederate and Union prisoners were incarcerated within its walls. Although it had no electricity or running water, the jail housed prisoners until it was decommissioned in 1939.

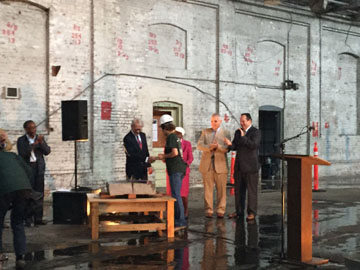
American College of the Building Arts ground breaking of the Old Charleston Trolley Barn on May 7, 2015

During the years spent occupying and renovating the jail, the college viewed itself as caretaker of the building and its rich history. As part of ACBA's living learning laboratory, faculty members led students in assessing needs and proper methods of restoration, preservation and reconstruction.

In September 2018, the college received national accreditation from the Accrediting Commission of Career Schools and Colleges.

== Additional programs ==
A diverse lineup of evening courses was introduced to the public beginning in the fall of 2017, including AutoCAD, interior design and history of Charleston architecture. In January 2018, ACBA initiated intensive one-week courses in areas such as sculptural blacksmithing, decorative woodcarving, furniture restoration, furniture design and stained glass. In the Fall of 2018, the school added an undergraduate major in classical architecture and design.
