= Stuart R. Purser =

American painter

Stuart Robert Purser
- Born: February 8, 1907; Stamps, Arkansas, U.S.
- Died: January 26, 1986 (aged 78); Gainesville, Florida, U.S.
- Education: Louisiana College
- Occupations: Visual Artist, University Professor, Author
- Known for: Painting, drawing
- Spouse: Mary May Purser
- Children: Robert S. Purser, Jeanne Cameron

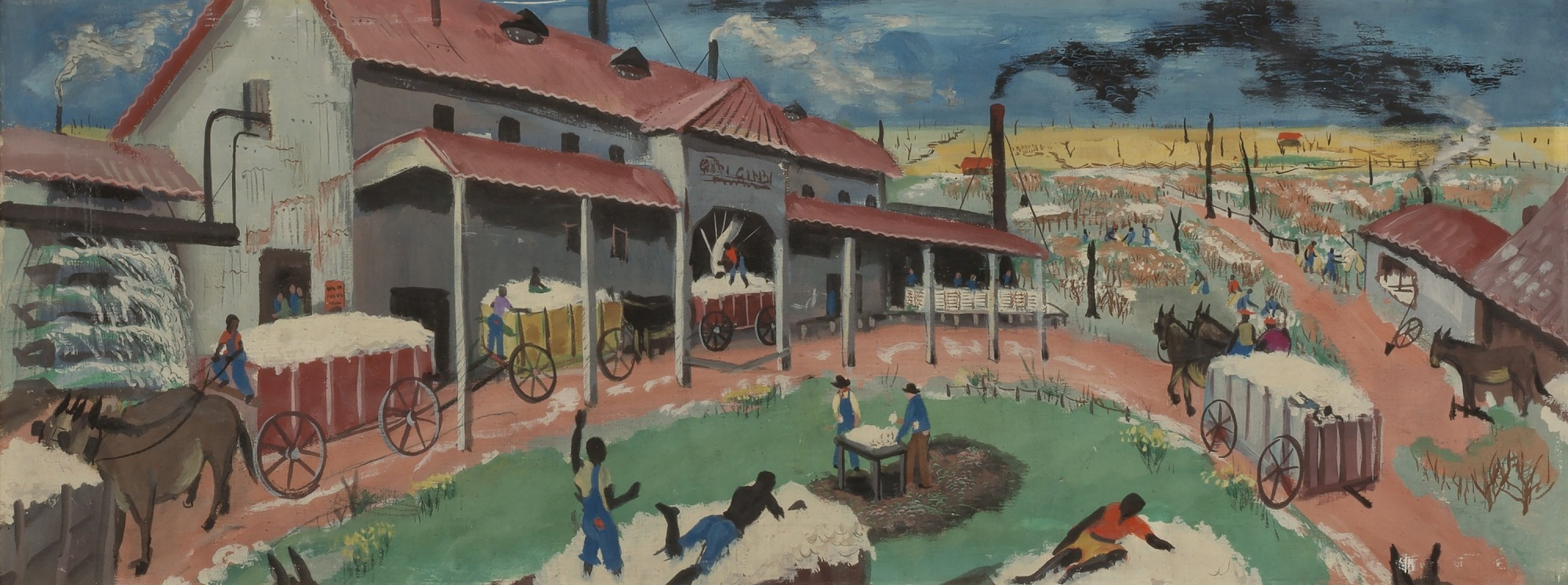
Ginnin’ Cotton (mural study, Leland, Mississippi Post Office)

Stuart Robert Purser (February 8, 1907 - January 26, 1986) was an American painter, writer, and academic.

Purser was born in Stamps, Arkansas, attended Louisiana College where he received his Bachelor of Arts degree and went on to receive his Master of fine Arts (MFA) from the Art Institute in Chicago. It was there he met art student, Mary May whom he married upon his graduation. On their return from Europe, he was invited to chair the Art Department at his alma mater, Louisiana College where their son, Robert, was born. They moved to Chattanooga, where Purser chaired the Art Department at the University of Tennessee, Chattanooga and their daughter, Jeanne, was born. In 1949, Purser received an invitation to chair the first Art Department at 'Ole Miss, the University of Mississippi in Oxford. It was there he met and became friends with William Faulkner. It was also in Oxford that Purser, while driving through the town of nearby Ecru, met a talented, young self-taught painter, M.B. Mayfield and offered him a job at the university as janitor in the Art Department, a place of his own to live, and introductions to other members of the Black community in Oxford (see David Magee, The Education of Mr. Mayfield: An Unusual Story of Social Change at Ole Miss (2009)). Purser arranged for Mayfield to set up an easel, provided him with paper, canvases, paint and brushes. With the door slightly open, MB could observe and paint. After class, Purser would then privately critique and tutor Mayfield. While the University officially turned a blind eye to this arrangement, many of the students, and some members of the community, including Faulkner, contributed to providing art supplies for Mayfield. M.B. Mayfield later became a recognized painter in his own right. Though an unofficial auditor, M.B. was the first Black student to have taken classes at Ole Miss, 13 years prior to the official enrollment of James Meredith in 1963.

Purser is the author of The Drawing Handbook, Applehead, Catahoula Cur, and Jesse Aaron.

Purser completed four WPA murals during the New Deal. He painted the mural Farm Scene with Senator Bankhead for the Carrollton, Alabama post office, Steamboats on the Mississippi for the Gretna, Louisiana post office, Southern Pattern for the Ferriday, Louisiana post office, and Ginnin' Cotton for the Leland, Mississippi post office. Ginnin' Cotton was the winning design for Mississippi in the 1939 48-State mural competition. His sketch for Ginnin' Cotton is in the Smithsonian American Art Museum.
