= Wetherbee House (Greenville, Mississippi) =

Historic house in Mississippi, United States

- U.S. National Register of Historic Places
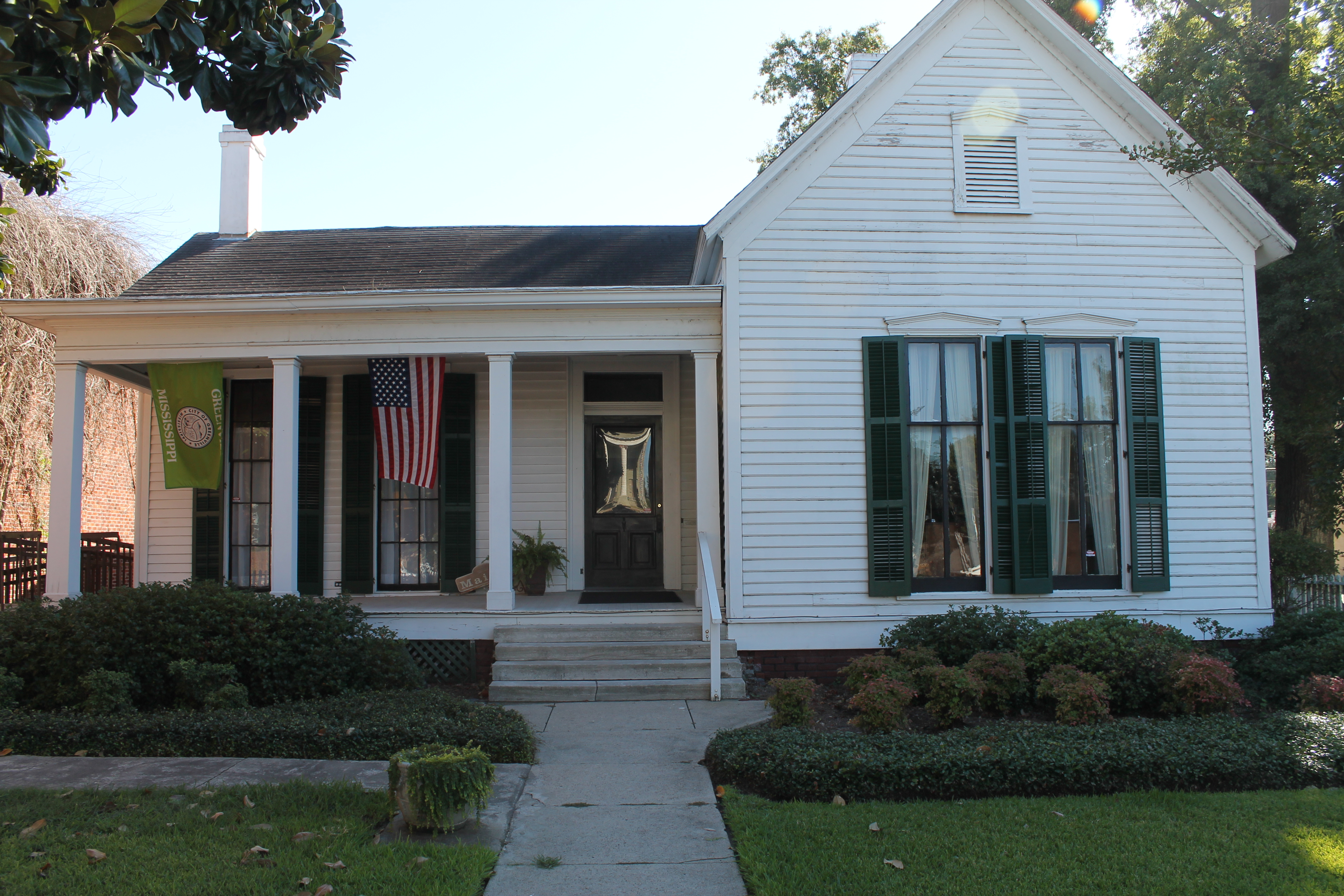
- The house in 2013

- Location within Mississippi Location within the United States
- Location: 503 Washington Ave., Greenville, Mississippi
- Coordinates: 33°24′38″N 91°3′36″W
- Built: property 1873, house completion circa 1880
- NRHP reference No.: 77000797
- Added to NRHP: October 28, 1977

The Wetherbee House is a historic cottage in Greenville, Mississippi. It is a small one-story frame-and-clapboard structure and is typical of American cottages in the late 19th century.

== History ==
The house was built on land purchased by Hiram Wetherbee in 1873, though the actual construction date is uncertain. Wetherbee was a Civil War veteran, having served with an Illinois Regiment of the Union army which for a time operated in the Greenville area. As with many mid-westerners, he returned to the area to settle.

Also on the properly is a 1 1/2-story brick house known the carriage house, and while some of the design elements show that it could have been used as such, its actual use is uncertain. Several additions were made to the house since it was originally built, one not long after the first construction, one in 1900, and one later in the first half of the twentieth century. The house has since been partially restored to its pre-1900 design.

The house stayed with the Wetherbee family until it was sold in 1973 to Council of Greenville Garden Clubs for use as a meeting place and museum. It currently houses the offices of The Greater Greenville Development Foundation. GGDF is composed of Main Street Greenville, a non-profit organization dedicated to the revitalization of downtown of Greenville, Mississippi; and The Greater Greenville Housing and Revitalization Association, Inc., a non-profit organization committed to providing safe and affordable housing to families residing in Greenville, Mississippi.

It was listed on the National Register of Historic Places on October 28, 1977.
