= Leland Historic District (Leland, Mississippi) =

Historic district in Mississippi, United States

- U.S. National Register of Historic Places
- U.S. Historic district
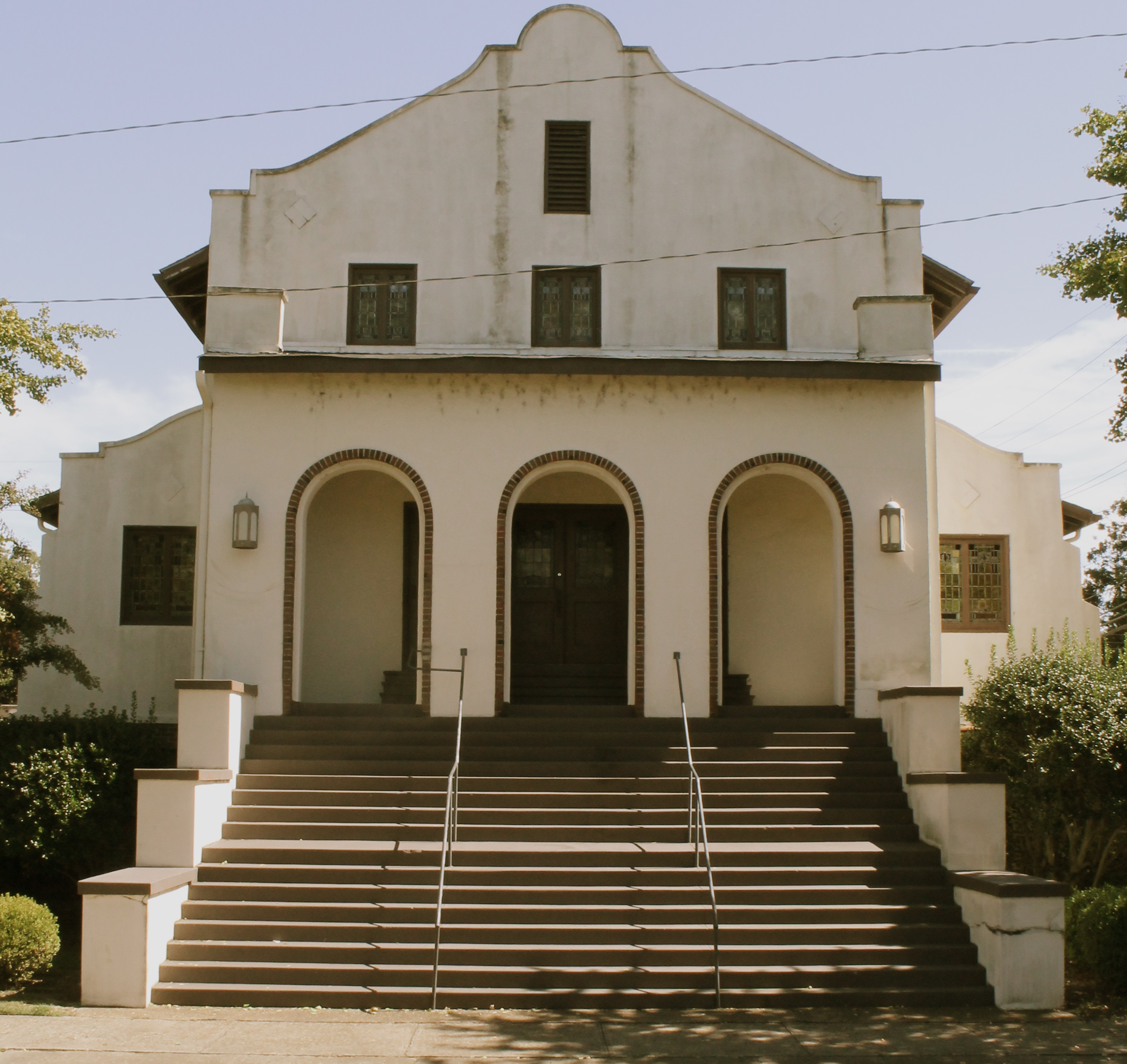
- United Methodist Church in Leland

- Location within Mississippi Location within the United States
- Location: Portions of N and S Broad, N and S Main, Deer Creek Dr., Third St., and more, in Leland, Mississippi
- Coordinates: 33°24′16″N 90°53′58″W
- Area: 165 acres (67 ha)
- Built: 1885
- Architectural style: Art Deco, Colonial Revival, etc.
- NRHP reference No.: 04001144
- Added to NRHP: October 12, 2004

Leland Historic District in Leland, Mississippi is a 165-acre (67 ha) historic district that was listed on the National Register of Historic Places in 2004.

Its NRHP nomination claims that the "density and diversity" of historic resources in the historic district area qualify it for NRHP listing, and that the district has local significance in the topic areas of architecture and of community planning and development. It includes 326 separately identified contributing buildings, four other contributing resources, and a number of intruding, non-contributing structures.

The 1938 U.S. Post Office in the district is separately listed on the National Register.

== See also ==
- National Register of Historic Places listings in Washington County, Mississippi
