= Greenville Commercial Historic District (Greenville, Mississippi) =

Historic district in Mississippi, United States

- U.S. National Register of Historic Places
- U.S. Historic district
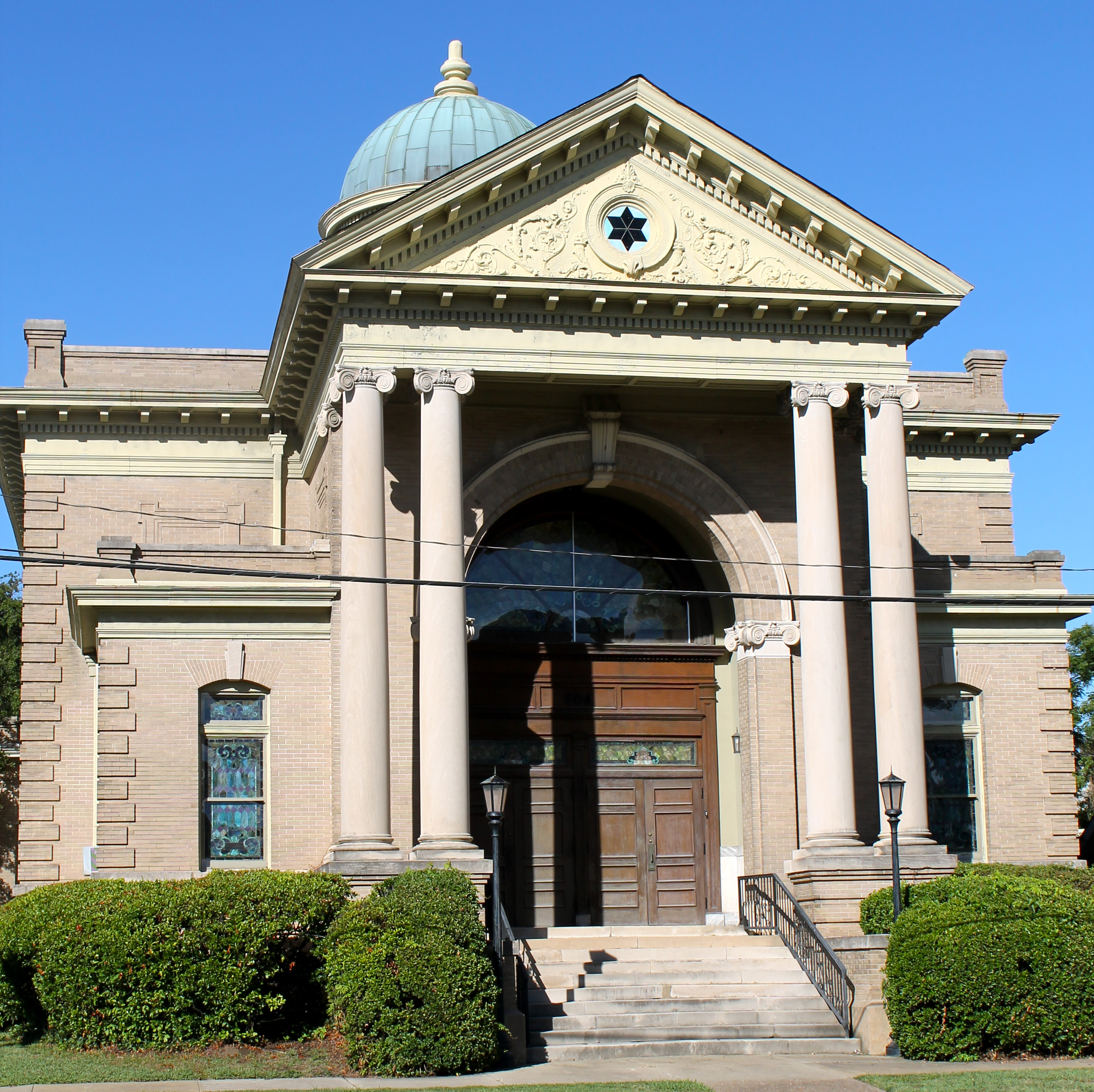

- Location within Mississippi Location within the United States
- Location: Roughly, Main St. from Walnut to Poplar Sts., Greenville, Mississippi
- Coordinates: 33°24′38″N 91°3′48″W
- Area: 7.3 acres (3.0 ha)
- Architect: Barber & Klutz and others
- Architectural style: Italianate, Romanesque, Classical Revival
- NRHP reference No.: 97000235
- Added to NRHP: October 10, 1997

The Greenville Commercial Historic District in Greenville, Mississippi is a 7.3-acre (3.0 ha) historic district that was listed on the National Register of Historic Places (NRHP) in 1997. It includes 12 contributing buildings, covering the majority of the 200 block of Main Street, plus 300 Main Street, 200 Walnut Street, 206 Walnut Street, and 211 Walnut Street. Among its properties are the Old Delta Democrat Times Building (c. 1880) at 201-203 Main St., and the First National Bank of Greenville (1903, designed by Barber & Klutz) which are both separately NRHP-listed.

== List of properties ==
- Old Delta Democrat Times Building (c. 1880), 201–203 Main Street
- 217, 219 and 221 Main Street (c. 1915)
- Fire Station No.2 (later Greenville Fire Museum; built c. 1928), 218 Main Street
- Citizen's Bank Building (c. 1898), 239B–241 Main Street
- First National Bank of Greenville (c. 1903), 302 Main Street
- First National Bank Building (Warehouse for the Mississippi Board of Levee Commissioners; c. 1880), 211 Walnut Street
- Fort Nicholson Armory Building (c. 1940), 224 South Walnut Street
- Headquarters for the Mississippi Board of Levee Commissioners (c. 1883), 229 Walnut Street
