= Garden & Gun =

US magazine

- Editor: David DiBenedetto
- Categories: Regional
- Frequency: Bimonthly
- Publisher: Christian Bryant
- Founder: Pierre Manigault, John Wilson, Rebecca Wesson Darwin
- Founded: 2007
- First issue: 2007; 19 years ago
- Company: Allée Group
- Based in: Charleston, South Carolina
- Website: www.gardenandgun.com
- ISSN: 1938-4831
- OCLC: 141187719

Garden & Gun is a national magazine focusing on the Southern United States. The magazine reports on the South's culture, food, music, art, literature, and its people and their ideas. Based in Charleston, South Carolina, it was created in 2007 by the Evening Post Publishing Company.

The magazine was conceived in 2004 by Pierre Manigault, chairman of Evening Post Publishing, and John Wilson, and launched three years later by EPP with Wilson as editor in chief and Rebecca Wesson Darwin as publisher. In its first year, the magazine won three ADDY Awards and eight Magazine Association of the Southeast GAMMA awards, and was named the nation's second-hottest magazine launch by MIN Magazine.

In 2009, Evening Post Publishing sold the magazine to Indigo Acquisition LLC, formed by Darwin and Manigault. Circulation was 223,000 at the time. Indigo was renamed Garden and Gun LLC in 2010 and "merged out of existence" in 2014, a year after Darwin and Manigault formed Allee Group, the magazine's current legal owner.

Garden & Gun covers art, skeet-shooting, gardens, Southern tradition, and land conservation. The name Garden & Gun is explained as an "inside reference to a popular 1970s Charleston disco called the Garden and Gun Club." It is also explained as a metaphor for the South's land, people, lifestyle, and heritage.

The magazine published one of cartoonist and novelist Doug Marlette's last written works before he died in a car crash. Other contributors have included Pat Conroy, Roy Blount Jr., Donna Tartt, Julia Reed, Rick Bragg, John T. Edge, Jessica B. Harris, Allison Glock, Heather Richie, and Kim Severson.

Sid Evans replaced Wilson as editor in chief in 2008.
