= 2020–21 Florida Gators men's basketball team =

American college basketball season

2020–21 Florida Gators men's basketball

NCAA tournament, second round
- Conference: Southeastern Conference
- Record: 15–10 (9–7 SEC)
- Head coach: Mike White (6th season)
- Associate head coach: Al Pinkins
- Assistant coaches: Jordan Mincy; Darris Nichols
- Home arena: O'Connell Center

2020–21 Southeastern Conference men's basketball standings
	Conf.				Overall
Team	W		L	PCT	W		L	PCT
No. 5 Alabama†	16	–	2	.889	26	–	7	.788
No. 10 Arkansas	13	–	4	.765	25	–	7	.781
LSU	11	–	6	.647	19	–	10	.655
Tennessee	10	–	7	.588	18	–	9	.667
Florida	9	–	7	.563	15	–	10	.600
Ole Miss	10	–	8	.556	16	–	12	.571
Missouri	8	–	8	.500	16	–	10	.615
Kentucky	8	–	9	.471	9	–	16	.360
Mississippi State	8	–	10	.444	18	–	15	.545
Georgia	7	–	11	.389	14	–	12	.538
Auburn^{*}	7	–	11	.389	13	–	14	.481
South Carolina	4	–	12	.250	6	–	15	.286
Texas A&M	2	–	8	.200	8	–	10	.444
Vanderbilt	3	–	13	.188	9	–	16	.360
† 2021 SEC tournament winner^{*} Ineligible for postseason due to self-imposed postseason ban.

The 2020–21 Florida Gators men's basketball team represented the University of Florida during the 2020–21 NCAA Division I men's basketball season. The team was led by sixth-year head coach Mike White, and played their home games at the O'Connell Center in Gainesville, Florida as a member of the Southeastern Conference. They finished the season 15–10, 9–7 in SEC Play to finish in 5th place. They defeated Vanderbilt in the second round of the SEC tournament before losing in the quarterfinals to Tennessee. They received an at-large bid to the NCAA tournament where they defeated Virginia Tech in the first round before getting upset in the second round by Oral Roberts.

== Roster ==
2020–21 Florida Gators men's basketball team
Players
Coaches

Pos.	#	Name	Height	Weight	Year	Previous school	Hometown
G	0	Ques Glover	5 ft 11 in (1.8 m)	182 lb (83 kg)	So	Bearden High School	Knoxville, Tennessee
G	1	Tre Mann	6 ft 5 in (1.96 m)	190 lb (86 kg)	So	The Villages Charter Schools	Gainesville, Florida
F	2	Samson Ruzhentsev	6 ft 7 in (2.01 m)	192 lb (87 kg)	Fr	Hamilton Heights Christian Academy	Moscow, Russia
G	3	Alex Klatsky	6 ft 4 in (1.93 m)	185 lb (84 kg)	Fr	Ranney School	Colts Neck, New Jersey
F	4	Anthony Duruji	6 ft 7 in (2.01 m)	220 lb (100 kg)	RS Jr	Louisiana Tech	Germantown, Maryland
F	5	Omar Payne	6 ft 10 in (2.08 m)	230 lb (104 kg)	So	Montverde Academy	Kissimmee, Florida
G	10	Noah Locke	6 ft 3 in (1.91 m)	203 lb (92 kg)	Jr	McDonogh School	Baltimore, Maryland
F	11	Keyontae Johnson	6 ft 5 in (1.96 m)	229 lb (104 kg)	Jr	Oak Hill Academy	Norfolk, Virginia
F	12	Colin Castleton	6 ft 11 in (2.11 m)	231 lb (105 kg)	RS Jr	Michigan	DeLand, Florida
F	15	Osayi Osifo	6 ft 7 in (2.01 m)	225 lb (102 kg)	Jr	Eastern Florida State College	Bedworth Park, South Africa
G	20	Jack May	6 ft 4 in (1.93 m)	175 lb (79 kg)	Fr	Saint Andrew's School	Boca Raton, Florida
G	22	Tyree Appleby	6 ft 1 in (1.85 m)	170 lb (77 kg)	RS Jr	Cleveland State	Jacksonville, Arkansas
G	23	Scottie Lewis	6 ft 5 in (1.96 m)	189 lb (86 kg)	So	Ranney School	Hazlet, New Jersey
C	33	Jason Jitoboh	6 ft 11 in (2.11 m)	285 lb (129 kg)	So	Hamilton Heights Christian Academy	Abuja, Nigeria
G	44	Niels Lane	6 ft 5 in (1.96 m)	206 lb (93 kg)	Fr	Roselle Catholic High School	Freehold, New Jersey

Head coach

- Mike White (Mississippi)

Assistant coach(es)

- Al Pinkens (NC State)
- Jordan Mincy (Kent State)
- Darris Nichols (West Virginia)

Legend

- (C) Team captain
- (S) Suspended
- (I) Ineligible
- (W) Walk-on
- Injured
- Current redshirt

Roster
Last update: March 16, 2021

== Schedule and results ==
Date time, TV	Rank^{#}	Opponent^{#}	Result	Record	High points	High rebounds	High assists	Site (attendance) city, state
Non-conference Regular season
November 25, 2020*; 4:30 pm		vs. UMass Lowell; Basketball Hall of Fame Bubbleville	Canceled^{[a]}					Mohegan Sun Arena; Uncasville, CT
November 27, 2020*; 11:30 am, ESPN		vs. No. 4 Virginia; Basketball Hall of Fame Bubbleville	Canceled^{[a]}					Mohegan Sun Arena; Uncasville, CT
December 2, 2020*; 5:00 pm, ESPN2		at Oklahoma	Canceled^{[a]}					Lloyd Noble Center; Norman, OK
December 2, 2020*; 2:30 pm, ESPN2		vs. Army; Basketball Hall of Fame Bubbleville	W 76–69	1–0	19 – Mann	8 – Castleton	4 – Mann	Mohegan Sun Arena (0); Uncasville, CT
December 3, 2020*; 9:30 pm, ESPN		vs. Boston College; Basketball Hall of Fame Bubbleville	W 90–70	2–0	24 – Johnson	12 – Johnson	6 – Mann	Mohegan Sun Arena (0); Uncasville, CT
December 6, 2020*; 2:00 pm, SECN		Stetson	W 86–40	3–0	19 – Johnson	10 – Lewis	6 – Lewis	O'Connell Center (2,193); Gainesville, FL
December 12, 2020*; 11:00 am, ESPNU		at No. 20 Florida State; Sunshine Showdown	L 71–83	3–1	19 – Lewis	8 – Mann	7 – Mann	Donald L. Tucker Center (2,761); Tallahassee, FL
December 16, 2020*; 7:00 pm, SECN		North Florida	Postponed^{[b]}					O'Connell Center; Gainesville, FL
December 19, 2020*; 12:00 pm		Florida Atlantic	Postponed^{[b]}					O'Connell Center; Gainesville, FL
December 20, 2020*		Florida A&M	Postponed^{[b]}					O'Connell Center; Gainesville, FL
December 22, 2020*; 7:00 pm, SECN		James Madison	Postponed^{[b]}					O'Connell Center; Gainesville, FL
SEC Regular season
December 30, 2020; 9:00 pm, ESPN2		at Vanderbilt	W 91–72	4–1 (1–0)	23 – Castleton	10 – Mann	4 – 2 tied	Memorial Gymnasium (94); Nashville, TN
January 2, 2021; 2:00 pm, CBS		LSU	W 83–79	5–1 (2–0)	21 – Castleton	7 – Duruji	5 – Appleby	O'Connell Center (2,211); Gainesville, FL
January 5, 2021; 7:00 pm, ESPN2		at Alabama	L 71–86	5–2 (2–1)	13 – Castleton	8 – Castleton	6 – Mann	Coleman Coliseum (2,055); Tuscaloosa, AL
January 9, 2021; 5:00 pm, ESPN		Kentucky; Rivalry	L 58–76	5–3 (2–2)	15 – Duruji	6 – Tied	3 – Mann	O'Connell Center (2,324); Gainesville, FL
January 12, 2021; 7:00 pm, SECN		Ole Miss	W 72–63	6–3 (3–2)	21 – Castleton	10 – Castleton	3 – Tied	O'Connell Center (2,254); Gainesville, FL
January 16, 2021; 4:00 pm, ESPN2		at Mississippi State	L 69–72	6–4 (3–3)	20 – Appleby	7 – Castleton	6 – Mann	Humphrey Coliseum (1,000); Starkville, MS
January 19, 2021; 7:00 pm, ESPN		No. 6 Tennessee	W 75–49	7–4 (4–3)	14 – Locke	9 – Payne	7 – Appleby	O'Connell Center (2,280); Gainesville, FL
January 23, 2021; 2:00 pm, ESPN2		at Georgia	W 92–84	8–4 (5–3)	24 – Mann	9 – Payne	4 – Mann	Stegeman Coliseum (1,638); Athens, GA
January 27, 2021; 6:30 pm, SECN		Vanderbilt	W 78–71	9–4 (6–3)	15 – Mann	5 – Tied	6 – Appleby	O'Connell Center (2,404); Gainesville, FL
January 30, 2021*; 2:00 pm, ESPN		at No. 11 West Virginia; Big 12/SEC Challenge	W 85–80	10–4	21 – Castleton	7 – Castleton	7 – Appleby	WVU Coliseum (1,000); Morgantown, WV
February 3, 2021; 6:30 pm, SECN	No. 22	South Carolina	L 66–72	10–5 (6–4)	17 – Mann	8 – Mann	4 – Appleby	O'Connell Center (2,282); Gainesville, FL
February 6, 2021; 2:00 pm, ESPN	No. 22	at LSU	Postponed					Pete Maravich Assembly Center; Baton Rouge, LA
February 13, 2021; 8:30 pm, SECN		Texas A&M	Postponed					O'Connell Center; Gainesville, FL
February 16, 2021; 7:00 pm, ESPN2		at No. 24 Arkansas	L 64–75	10–6 (6–5)	16 – Appleby	8 – Mann	2 – Appleby	Bud Walton Arena (4,400); Fayetteville, AR
February 20, 2021; 3:30 pm, SECN		Georgia	W 70–63	11–6 (7–5)	14 – Castleton	9 – Duruji	3 – Mann	O'Connell Center (2,345); Gainesville, FL
February 23, 2021; 7:00 pm, ESPN		at Auburn	W 74–57	12–6 (8–5)	19 – Mann	13 – Mann	3 – Mann	Auburn Arena (1,824); Auburn, AL
February 27, 2021; 4:00 pm, CBS		at Kentucky; Rivalry	W 71–67	13–6 (9–5)	21 – Mann	8 – Mann	5 – Appleby	Rupp Arena (3,075); Lexington, KY
March 3, 2021; 6:30 pm, SECN		Missouri	L 70–72	13–7 (9–6)	21 – Mann	11 – Duruji	5 – Appleby	O'Connell Center (2,306); Gainesville, FL
March 7, 2021; 12:00 pm, ESPNU		at Tennessee	L 54–65	13–8 (9–7)	18 – Appleby	6 – Castleton	3 – Appleby	Thompson–Boling Arena (4,191); Knoxville, TN
SEC tournament
March 11, 2021; 2:30 pm, SECN	(5)	vs. (12) Vanderbilt; Second Round	W 69–63	14–8	22 – Mann	8 – Castleton	6 – Mann	Bridgestone Arena (1,733); Nashville, TN
March 12, 2021; 2:30 pm, ESPN	(5)	vs. (4) Tennessee; Quarterfinals	L 66–78	14–9	30 – Mann	7 – Castleton	2 – Tied	Bridgestone Arena (2,186); Nashville, TN
NCAA tournament
March 19, 2021; 12:15 pm, CBS	(7 S)	vs. (10 S) No. 25 Virginia Tech; First Round	W 75–70 ^{OT}	15–9	19 – Castleton	13 – Castleton	4 – Mann	Hinkle Fieldhouse; Indianapolis, IN
March 21, 2021; 7:45 pm, truTV	(7 S)	vs. (15 S) Oral Roberts; Second Round	L 78–81	15–10	19 – Mann	10 – Castleton	5 – Appleby	Indiana Farmers Coliseum (979); Indianapolis, IN
*Non-conference game. ^{#}Rankings from AP Poll. (#) Tournament seedings in parentheses. All times are in Eastern Time.

^{^[a]}The games against UMass Lowell and Virginia were canceled due to Florida pausing team activities for one week due to positive COVID-19 tests and contact tracing protocols. The Oklahoma game was canceled later in the week, moving the home-and-home series back one year.
^{^[b]}The games against North Florida, Florida Atlanta, Florida A&M, and James Madison were postponed following the hospitalization of Keyontae Johnson after collapsing mid-game during the first half of the Florida State game.

== Rankings ==
Ranking movements Legend: ██ Increase in ranking ██ Decrease in ranking — = Not ranked RV = Received votes
	Week																	
Poll	Pre	1	2	3	4	5	6	7	8	9	10	11	12	13	14	15	16	Final
AP	RV	RV	RV	RV	RV	RV	RV	RV	—	RV	22	RV	RV	—	RV	—	—	Not released
Coaches	RV	RV^	25	RV	RV	RV	RV	RV	—	RV	23	RV	RV	—	RV	RV	—	RV

^Coaches did not release a Week 1 poll.
