= 2021 SEC men's basketball tournament =

American college basketball postseason tournament

- Classification: Division I
- Season: 2020–21
- Teams: 13
- Site: Bridgestone Arena; Nashville, Tennessee
- Champions: Alabama (7th title)
- Winning coach: Nate Oats (1st title)
- MVP: Jahvon Quinerly (Alabama)
- Attendance: 14,782
- Television: SEC Network, ESPN

2020–21 Southeastern Conference men's basketball standings
	Conf.				Overall
Team	W		L	PCT	W		L	PCT
No. 5 Alabama†	16	–	2	.889	26	–	7	.788
No. 10 Arkansas	13	–	4	.765	25	–	7	.781
LSU	11	–	6	.647	19	–	10	.655
Tennessee	10	–	7	.588	18	–	9	.667
Florida	9	–	7	.563	15	–	10	.600
Ole Miss	10	–	8	.556	16	–	12	.571
Missouri	8	–	8	.500	16	–	10	.615
Kentucky	8	–	9	.471	9	–	16	.360
Mississippi State	8	–	10	.444	18	–	15	.545
Georgia	7	–	11	.389	14	–	12	.538
Auburn^{*}	7	–	11	.389	13	–	14	.481
South Carolina	4	–	12	.250	6	–	15	.286
Texas A&M	2	–	8	.200	8	–	10	.444
Vanderbilt	3	–	13	.188	9	–	16	.360
† 2021 SEC tournament winner^{*} Ineligible for postseason due to self-imposed postseason ban.

The 2021 Southeastern Conference men's basketball tournament was the postseason men's basketball tournament for the Southeastern Conference at Bridgestone Arena in Nashville, Tennessee, which took place March 10–14, 2021.

== Seeds ==
On November 22, 2020, Auburn announced a self-imposed, one year postseason ban due to former assistant coach Chuck Person's involvement in the 2017–18 NCAA Division I men's basketball corruption scandal. As a result, the #11 seed in the tournament was awarded a first-round bye, leaving the #12 seed–#13 seed game as the only game to be played on March 10. Teams were seeded by conference record, with a tiebreaker system used to seed teams with identical conference records. The top 11 teams received a first round bye and the top four teams received a double bye, automatically advancing them into the quarterfinals.

Seed	School	Conference
1	Alabama	16–2
2	Arkansas	13–4
3	LSU	11–6
4	Tennessee	10–7
5	Florida	9–7
6	Ole Miss	10–8
7	Missouri	8–8
8	Kentucky	8–9
9	Mississippi State	8–10
10	Georgia	7–11
11	South Carolina	4–12
12	Vanderbilt	3–13
13	Texas A&M	2–8

== Schedule ==
Session	Game	Time*	Matchup^{#}	Score	Television	Attendance
First round – Wednesday, March 10
1	1	6:00 pm	No. 12 Vanderbilt vs. No. 13 Texas A&M	79–68	SECN	1,149
Second round – Thursday, March 11
2	2	11:00 am	No. 8 Kentucky vs. No. 9 Mississippi State	73–74	SECN	1,733
2	3	1:30 pm	No. 5 Florida vs. No. 12 Vanderbilt	69–63	SECN	1,733
3	4	6:00 pm	No. 7 Missouri vs. No. 10 Georgia	73–70	SECN	1,809
3	5	8:30 pm	No. 6 Ole Miss vs. No. 11 South Carolina	76–59	SECN	1,809
Quarterfinals – Friday, March 12
4	6	11:00 am	No. 1 Alabama vs. No. 9 Mississippi State	85–48	ESPN	2,186
4	7	1:30 pm	No. 4 Tennessee vs. No. 5 Florida	78–66	ESPN	2,186
5	8	6:00 pm	No. 2 Arkansas vs. No. 7 Missouri	70–64	SECN	2,155
5	9	8:30 pm	No. 3 LSU vs. No. 6 Ole Miss	76–73	SECN	2,155
Semifinals – Saturday, March 13
6	10	12:00 pm	No. 1 Alabama vs. No. 4 Tennessee	73–68	ESPN	3,164
6	11	2:45 pm	No. 2 Arkansas vs. No. 3 LSU	71–78	ESPN	3,164
Championship – Sunday, March 14
7	12	12:00 pm	No. 1 Alabama vs. No. 3 LSU	80–79	ESPN	2,586

*Game times in Central Time. #Rankings denote tournament seeding.

== Bracket ==
First round Wednesday, March 10; SEC Network
12	Vanderbilt	79
13	Texas A&M	68

Second round Thursday, March 11; SEC Network
8	Kentucky	73
9	Mississippi State	74
5	Florida	69
12	Vanderbilt	63
7	Missouri	73
10	Georgia	70
6	Ole Miss	76
11	South Carolina	59

Quarterfinals; Friday, March 12; ESPN/SEC Network
1	Alabama	85
9	Mississippi State	48
4	Tennessee	78
5	Florida	66
2	Arkansas	70
7	Missouri	64
3	LSU	76
6	Ole Miss	73

Semifinals; Saturday, March 13; ESPN
1	Alabama	73
4	Tennessee	68
2	Arkansas	71
3	LSU	78

Championship; Sunday, March 14; ESPN
1	Alabama	80
3	LSU	79

== Game summaries ==
=== First round ===
SECN

March 10
6:00 p.m.

No. 12 Vanderbilt 79, No. 13 Texas A&M 68
Scoring by half: 37–27, 42–41
Pts: Pippen Jr. (22); Rebs: Brown/Evans/Harvey/Milora-Brown (5); Asts: Pippen Jr. (6)	Pts: Miller (22); Rebs: Miller (10); Asts: Gordon (5)

Bridgestone Arena
Nashville, TN
Attendance: 1,149
Referees: Tony Greene, Don Daily, Terry Wymer

=== Second round ===
SECN

March 11
11:00 a.m.

No. 9 Mississippi State 74, No. 8 Kentucky 73
Scoring by half: 44-30, 30-43
Pts: Molinar (21); Rebs: T. Smith (11); Asts: Stewart (10)	Pts: Mintz (16); Rebs: Sarr/Brooks Jr. (5); Asts: Mintz (8)

Bridgestone Arena
Nashville, TN
Attendance: 1,733
Referees: Joe Lindsay, Patrick Evans, Chuck Jones

SECN

March 11
1:30 p.m.

No. 5 Florida 69, No. 12 Vanderbilt 63
Scoring by half: 34–22, 35–41
Pts: Mann (22); Rebs: Castleton (8); Asts: Mann (6)	Pts: Pippen Jr. (23); Rebs: Brown (7); Asts: Pippen Jr. (4)

Bridgestone Arena
Nashville, TN
Attendance: 1,733
Referees: Doug Shows, Byron Jarrett, K.B. Burdett

SECN

March 11
6:00 p.m.

No. 7 Missouri 73, No. 10 Georgia 70
Scoring by half: 32–33, 41–37
Pts: Pinson (17); Rebs: D. Smith (8); Asts: Brown (4)	Pts: Wheeler (14); Rebs: Camara (10); Asts: Wheeler (13)

Bridgestone Arena
Nashville, TN
Attendance: 1,809
Referees: Pat Adams, Bart Lenox, Vladimir Voyard-Tadal

SECN

March 11
8:30 p.m.

No. 6 Ole Miss 76, No. 11 South Carolina 59
Scoring by half: 41–26, 35–33
Pts: Joiner (18); Rebs: Buffen (9); Asts: Shuler (5)	Pts: McCreary (15); Rebs: Leveque (6); Asts: Moss (6)

Bridgestone Arena
Nashville, TN
Attendance: 1,809
Referees: Terry Oglesby, Steven Anderson, Owen Shortt

=== Quarterfinals ===
ESPN

March 12
11:00 a.m.

No. 1 Alabama 85, No. 9 Mississippi State 48
Scoring by half: 47–19, 38–29
Pts: Quinerly (14); Rebs: Jones/Ellis (7); Asts: Jones (7)	Pts: Mintz (18); Rebs: Sarr/Brooks Jr. (11); Asts: Mintz (2)

Bridgestone Arena
Nashville, TN
Attendance: 2,186
Referees: Don Daily, Tony Greene, K.B. Burdett

ESPN

March 12
1:30 p.m.

No. 4 Tennessee 78, No. 5 Florida 66
Scoring by half: 31–22, 47–44
Pts: Vescovi (14); Rebs: Johnson/James (9); Asts: Johnson/James (6)	Pts: Mann (30); Rebs: Castleton (7); Asts: Castleton/Lewis (2)

Bridgestone Arena
Nashville, TN
Attendance: 2,186
Referees: Pat Adams, Patrick Evans, Terry Wymer

SECN

March 12
6:00 p.m.

No. 2 Arkansas 70, No. 7 Missouri 64
Scoring by half: 32–33, 38–31
Pts: Notae (27); Rebs: Smith/Moody (8); Asts: Davis/Notae (4)	Pts: Pinson (14); Rebs: Brown (11); Asts: D. Smith (5)

Bridgestone Arena
Nashville, TN
Attendance: 2,155
Referees: Doug Shows, Terry Oglesby, Steven Anderson

SECN

March 12
8:30 p.m.

No. 3 LSU 76, No. 6 Ole Miss 73
Scoring by half: 29–27, 47–46
Pts: Watford (24); Rebs: Days (12); Asts: Smart (5)	Pts: Joiner (26); Rebs: White (13); Asts: Shuler (3)

Bridgestone Arena
Nashville, TN
Attendance: 2,155
Referees: Joe Lindsay, Byron Jarrett, Bart Lenox

=== Semifinals ===
ESPN

March 13
12:00 p.m.

No. 1 Alabama 73, No. 4 Tennessee 68
Scoring by half: 31–40, 42–28
Pts: Jones (21); Rebs: Jones (13); Asts: Jones (4)	Pts: Johnson (20); Rebs: Johnson (9); Asts: Vescovi (4)

Bridgestone Arena
Nashville, TN
Attendance: 3,164
Referees: Don Daily, Tony Greene, Chuck Jones

ESPN

March 13
2:30 p.m.

No. 2 Arkansas 71, No. 3 LSU 78
Scoring by half: 37-40, 34-38
Pts: Moody (21); Rebs: Moody (8); Asts: Davis (4)	Pts: Thomas (28); Rebs: Days/LeBlanc (9); Asts: Smart (5)

Bridgestone Arena
Nashville, TN
Attendance: 3,164
Referees: Terry Oglesby, Patrick Evans, Bart Lenox

=== Final ===
ESPN

March 14
12:00 p.m.

No. 1 Alabama 80, No. 3 LSU 79
Scoring by half: 40-37, 40-42
Pts: Shackelford (21); Rebs: Jones (11); Asts: Jones (6)	Pts: Watford (30); Rebs: Days (12); Asts: Smart (5)

Bridgestone Arena
Nashville, TN
Attendance: 3,400
Referees: Doug Shows, Pat Adams, Joe Lindsay

== See also ==
- 2021 SEC women's basketball tournament
