= 2020–21 South Carolina Gamecocks men's basketball team =

American college basketball season

2020–21 South Carolina Gamecocks men's basketball
- Conference: Southeastern Conference
- Record: 6–15 (4–12 SEC)
- Head coach: Frank Martin (9th season)
- Assistant coaches: Will Bailey; Chuck Martin; Bruce Shingler
- Home arena: Colonial Life Arena

2020–21 Southeastern Conference men's basketball standings
	Conf.				Overall
Team	W		L	PCT	W		L	PCT
No. 5 Alabama†	16	–	2	.889	26	–	7	.788
No. 10 Arkansas	13	–	4	.765	25	–	7	.781
LSU	11	–	6	.647	19	–	10	.655
Tennessee	10	–	7	.588	18	–	9	.667
Florida	9	–	7	.563	15	–	10	.600
Ole Miss	10	–	8	.556	16	–	12	.571
Missouri	8	–	8	.500	16	–	10	.615
Kentucky	8	–	9	.471	9	–	16	.360
Mississippi State	8	–	10	.444	18	–	15	.545
Georgia	7	–	11	.389	14	–	12	.538
Auburn^{*}	7	–	11	.389	13	–	14	.481
South Carolina	4	–	12	.250	6	–	15	.286
Texas A&M	2	–	8	.200	8	–	10	.444
Vanderbilt	3	–	13	.188	9	–	16	.360
† 2021 SEC tournament winner^{*} Ineligible for postseason due to self-imposed postseason ban.

The 2020–21 South Carolina Gamecocks men's basketball team represented the University of South Carolina during the 2020–21 NCAA Division I men's basketball season. The team is led by ninth-year head coach Frank Martin, and play their home games at Colonial Life Arena in Columbia, South Carolina as a member of the Southeastern Conference.

== Previous season ==
The Gamecocks finished the 2019–20 season 18–13, 10–8 in SEC play to finish in a tie for sixth place. As the No. 6 seed in the SEC tournament, they were set to take on Arkansas in the second round before the remainder of the SEC Tournament was canceled due to the ongoing COVID-19 pandemic.

== Offseason ==
=== Departures ===
Name	Number	Pos.	Height	Weight	Year	Hometown	Reason for departure
Micaiah Henry	13	F	6'9"	235	Senior	Decatur, GA	Graduated
Maik Kotsar	21	F	6'11"	270	Senior	Tallinn, Estonia	Graduated
Jair Bolden	52	G	6'3"	215	RS Junior	Brooklyn, NY	Graduate transferred to Butler

=== Incoming transfers ===
Name	Number	Pos.	Height	Weight	Year	Hometown	Notes
Ford Cooper Jr.	44	G	6'3"	187	Sophomore	Charlotte, NC	Transfer from Missouri State

=== 2020 recruiting class ===
College recruiting
Name	Hometown	School	Height	Weight	Commit date
Patrick Iriel; C	Columbia, SC	A. C. Flora (SC)	6 ft 10 in (2.08 m)	235 lb (107 kg)	Aug 6, 2019
Patrick Iriel; C	Recruit ratings: Rivals: 247Sports: ESPN: (80)				
Ja'Von Benson; PF	Columbia, SC	Ridge View (SC)	6 ft 8 in (2.03 m)	240 lb (110 kg)	Oct 18, 2019
Ja'Von Benson; PF	Recruit ratings: Rivals: 247Sports: ESPN: (78)				
Tre-Vaughn Minott; C	Montreal, QC	NBA Academy Latin America (MX)	6 ft 11 in (2.11 m)	245 lb (111 kg)	Jan 8, 2021
Tre-Vaughn Minott; C	Recruit ratings: Rivals: 247Sports: ESPN:				
Overall recruit ranking:
Note: In many cases, Scout, Rivals, 247Sports, On3, and ESPN may conflict in their listings of height and weight.; In these cases, the average was taken. ESPN grades are on a 100-point scale.; Sources: "South Carolina 2020 Basketball Commitments". Rivals.; "2020 South Carolina Gamecocks Recruiting Class". ESPN.; "2020 Team Ranking". Rivals.

== Roster ==
2020–21 South Carolina Gamecocks men's basketball team
Players
Coaches
Professional basketball player

Pos.	#	Name	Height	Weight	Year	Previous school	Hometown
G	00	A. J. Lawson	6 ft 6 in (1.98 m)	177 lb (80 kg)	Jr	GTA Prep	Mississauga, ON
G	1	T. J. Moss	6 ft 4 in (1.93 m)	175 lb (79 kg)	RS So	Findlay Prep	Memphis, TN
F	2	Trey Anderson	6 ft 6 in (1.98 m)	205 lb (93 kg)	So	Mater Dei Catholic	San Diego, CA
F	4	Jalyn McCreary	6 ft 8 in (2.03 m)	235 lb (107 kg)	So	Legacy Early College	Marietta, GA
G	5	Jermaine Couisnard	6 ft 4 in (1.93 m)	216 lb (98 kg)	RS So	Montverde Academy	East Chicago, IN
F	10	Justin Minaya	6 ft 6 in (1.98 m)	215 lb (98 kg)	RS Jr	Northern Valley Regional HS	Harrington Park, NJ
G	12	Trae Hannibal	6 ft 3 in (1.91 m)	220 lb (100 kg)	So	Hartsville	Hartsville, SC
G	13	Mike Green (W)	6 ft 2 in (1.88 m)	185 lb (84 kg)	So	Christian Academy of Myrtle Beach	Myrtle Beach, SC
F	14	Nathan Nelson (W)	6 ft 7 in (2.01 m)	201 lb (91 kg)	Jr	Blackman HS	Murfreesboro, TN
F/C	15	Wildens Leveque	6 ft 10 in (2.08 m)	242 lb (110 kg)	So	Gould Academy	Brocton, MA
F	20	Alanzo Frink	6 ft 8 in (2.03 m)	264 lb (120 kg)	Jr	Roselle Catholic HS	Jersey City, NJ
F	21	Ja'Von Benson	6 ft 7 in (2.01 m)	253 lb (115 kg)	Fr	Ridge View HS	Columbia, SC
G	23	Seventh Woods	6 ft 2 in (1.88 m)	184 lb (83 kg)	RS Sr	Hammond School; North Carolina	Columbia, SC
F	24	Keyshawn Bryant	6 ft 6 in (1.98 m)	195 lb (88 kg)	Jr	Winter Haven HS	Winter Haven, FL
G	44	Ford Cooper Jr.	6 ft 3 in (1.91 m)	187 lb (85 kg)	So	United Faith Christian Academy; Missouri State	Charlotte, NC
C	50	Tre-Vaughn Minott	6 ft 9 in (2.06 m)	280 lb (127 kg)	Fr	NBA Academy Latin America	Montreal, QC

Head coach

- Frank Martin (FIU)

Assistant coach(es)

- Will Bailey (UAB)
- Bruce Shingler (St. Augustine's)
- Chuck Martin (Monmouth)

Legend

- (C) Team captain
- (S) Suspended
- (I) Ineligible
- (W) Walk-on
- Injured
- Current redshirt

Roster

== Schedule and results ==
The exhibition game against Coker scheduled for November 25 was cancelled due to a delay in the delivery of Coker’s COVID-19 testing results.

Date time, TV	Rank^{#}	Opponent^{#}	Result	Record	High points	High rebounds	High assists	Site (attendance) city, state
Regular season
November 25, 2020*		Coker	cancelled due to COVID-19 pandemic					Colonial Life Arena; Columbia, SC
November 28, 2020*; 4:00 p.m, ESPNews		vs. Liberty; Hall of Fame Classic Semifinals	L 62–78	0–1	12 – Lawson	7 – Bryant	2 – Tied	T-Mobile Center (0); Kansas City, MO
November 29, 2020*; 1:00 p.m., ESPN2		vs. Tulsa; Hall of Fame Classic Third Place Game	W 69–58	1–1	20 – Couisnard	9 – Tied	4 – Couisnard	T-Mobile Center (0); Kansas City, MO
December 5, 2020*; 6:00 p.m., ESPN+		at No. 10 Houston	L 67–77	1–2	13 – Minaya	7 – Hannibal	3 – Tied	Fertitta Center (1,859); Houston, TX
December 10, 2020*; 6:00 p.m., SECN		Wofford	cancelled due to COVID-19 pandemic					Colonial Life Arena; Columbia, SC
December 14, 2020*; 7:00 p.m., CBSSN		at George Washington	cancelled due to COVID-19 pandemic					Charles E. Smith Center; Washington, D.C.
December 19, 2020*; 12:00 p.m., ESPNU		No. 24 Clemson; Rivalry	cancelled due to COVID-19 pandemic					Colonial Life Arena; Columbia, SC
December 23, 2020*; 7:00 p.m., SECN		South Carolina State	cancelled due to COVID-19 pandemic					Colonial Life Arena; Columbia, SC
January 2, 2021*; 3:30 p.m., SECN		Florida A&M	W 78–71	2–2	25 – Lawson	10 – Minaya	5 – Couisnard	Colonial Life Arena (3,100); Columbia, SC
January 6, 2021; 9:00 p.m., ESPNU		Texas A&M	W 78–54	3–2 (1–0)	30 – Lawson	9 – McCreary	5 – Minaya	Colonial Life Arena (3160); Columbia, SC
January 9, 2021; 6:00 p.m., SECN		at Ole Miss	postponed due to the COVID-19 pandemic					The Pavilion at Ole Miss; Oxford, MS
January 12, 2021; 7:00 p.m., ESPN2/ESPNU		No. 10 Tennessee	postponed due to the COVID-19 pandemic					Colonial Life Arena; Columbia, SC
January 16, 2021; 8:30 p.m., SECN		at LSU	L 80–85	3–3 (1–1)	26 – Bryant	10 – Minaya	5 – Tied	Pete Maravich Assembly Center (2,143); Baton Rouge, LA
January 19, 2021; 7:00 p.m., SECN		at Missouri	L 70–81	3–4 (1–2)	19 – Bryant	11 – Minaya	5 – Tied	Mizzou Arena (0); Columbia, MO
January 23, 2021; 12:00 p.m., ESPN2		Auburn	L 86–109	3–5 (1–3)	24 – Bryant	10 – Leveque	6 – Couisnard	Colonial Life Arena (3,250); Columbia, SC
January 27, 2021; 7:00 p.m., ESPN2		Georgia	W 83–59	4–5 (2–3)	19 – Bryant	10 – Bryant	6 – Hannibal	Colonial Life Arena (3,156); Columbia, SC
January 30, 2021; 8:30 p.m., SECN		at Vanderbilt	L 81–93	4–6 (2–4)	21 – Lawson	6 – Bryant	4 – Couisnard	Memorial Gymnasium (78); Nashville, TN
February 3, 2021; 6:30 p.m., SECN		at No. 22 Florida	W 72–66	5–6 (3–4)	22 – Lawson	8 – Lawson	2 – Tied	O'Connell Center (2,282); Gainesville, FL
February 6, 2021; 3:30 p.m., SECN		Mississippi State	L 59–75	5–7 (3–5)	13 – Tied	10 – Leveque	4 – Couisnard	Colonial Life Arena (3,208); Columbia, SC
February 9, 2021; 6:30 p.m., SECN		No. 11 Alabama	L 78–81	5–8 (3–6)	21 – Lawson	7 – Minaya	5 – Couisnard	Colonial Life Arena (3,089); Columbia, SC
February 13, 2021; 6:00 p.m., SECN		Ole Miss	L 74–81	5–9 (3–7)	22 – Lawson	9 – Minaya	4 – Hannibal	Colonial Life Arena (3,250); Columbia, SC
February 17, 2021; 9:00 p.m., SECN		at No. 19 Tennessee	L 73–93	5–10 (3–8)	20 – Lawson	7 – Bryant	7 – Woods	Thompson–Boling Arena (4,191); Knoxville, TN
February 20, 2021; 2:00 p.m., ESPN2		No. 20 Missouri	L 78–93	5–11 (3–9)	22 – Lawson	6 – Leveque	2 – Bryant	Colonial Life Arena (3,176); Columbia, SC
February 24, 2021; 7:00 p.m., SECN		at Mississippi State	L 48–69	5–12 (3–10)	14 – Bryant	8 – Minaya	4 – Moss	Humphrey Coliseum (1,000); Starkville, MS
February 27, 2021; 1:00 p.m., SECN		at Georgia	W 91–70	6–12 (4–10)	23 – Couisnard	8 – Hannibal	5 – Tied	Stegeman Coliseum (1,638); Athens, GA
March 2, 2021; 6:30 p.m., SECN		No. 12 Arkansas	L 73–101	6–13 (4–11)	18 – Lawson	9 – Bryant	7 – Moss	Colonial Life Arena (3,193); Columbia, SC
March 6, 2021; 12:00 p.m., ESPN		at Kentucky	L 64–92	6–14 (4–12)	16 – Bryant	6 – Hannibal	6 – Hannibal	Rupp Arena; Lexington, KY
SEC tournament
March 11, 2021; 9:30 p.m., SECN	(11)	vs. (6) Ole Miss; Second round	L 59–76	6–15	15 – McCreary	6 – Leveque	6 – Moss	Bridgestone Arena (1,809); Nashville, TN
*Non-conference game. ^{#}Rankings from AP Poll. (#) Tournament seedings in parentheses. All times are in Eastern Time.
