= 2020–21 Missouri Tigers men's basketball team =

American college basketball season

2020–21 Missouri Tigers men's basketball

NCAA tournament, first round
- Conference: Southeastern Conference
- Record: 16–10 (8–8 SEC)
- Head coach: Cuonzo Martin (4th season)
- Assistant coaches: Chris Hollender; Cornell Mann; Marco Harris
- Home arena: Mizzou Arena

2020–21 Southeastern Conference men's basketball standings
	Conf.				Overall
Team	W		L	PCT	W		L	PCT
No. 5 Alabama†	16	–	2	.889	26	–	7	.788
No. 10 Arkansas	13	–	4	.765	25	–	7	.781
LSU	11	–	6	.647	19	–	10	.655
Tennessee	10	–	7	.588	18	–	9	.667
Florida	9	–	7	.563	15	–	10	.600
Ole Miss	10	–	8	.556	16	–	12	.571
Missouri	8	–	8	.500	16	–	10	.615
Kentucky	8	–	9	.471	9	–	16	.360
Mississippi State	8	–	10	.444	18	–	15	.545
Georgia	7	–	11	.389	14	–	12	.538
Auburn^{*}	7	–	11	.389	13	–	14	.481
South Carolina	4	–	12	.250	6	–	15	.286
Texas A&M	2	–	8	.200	8	–	10	.444
Vanderbilt	3	–	13	.188	9	–	16	.360
† 2021 SEC tournament winner^{*} Ineligible for postseason due to self-imposed postseason ban.

The 2020–21 Missouri Tigers men's basketball team represented the University of Missouri in the 2020–21 NCAA Division I men's basketball season and was led by head coach Cuonzo Martin, who was in his fourth year at Missouri. The team played its home games at Mizzou Arena in Columbia, Missouri as a ninth-year members of the Southeastern Conference. They finished the season 16-10, 8-8 in SEC Play to finish in 7th place. They defeated Georgia in the Second Round of the SEC tournament before losing in the quarterfinals to Arkansas. They received an at-large bid to the NCAA tournament where they lost in the First Round to Oklahoma.

== Previous season ==
The Tigers finished the 2019–20 season 15–16, 7–11 in SEC play to finish in a tie for 10th place with Arkansas. Missouri never got a chance to play in the 2020 SEC men's basketball tournament because of the coronavirus pandemic.

=== Departures ===
Name	Number	Pos.	Height	Weight	Year	Hometown	Notes
Reed Nikko	14	F	6'10"	240	Senior	Maple Grove, MN	Graduated
Mario McKinney Jr.	11	G	6'2"	185	Freshman	St. Louis, MO	Transferring to John A. Logan College
LaTrayvion Jackson	2	F	6'8"	215	Sophomore	Ypsilanti, MI	Transferring to Seton Hall
Axel Okongo	15	C	7'0"	250	Senior	Saâcy-sur-Marne, France	Transferring to Eastern Michigan

Assistant Coach Michael Porter Sr.'s contract was not renewed at the end of the season.

=== 2020 recruiting class ===
College recruiting information
Name	Hometown	School	Height	Weight	Commit date
Jordan Wilmore; C	Fredericksburg, Virginia	The Skill Factory Prep School	7 ft 2 in (2.18 m)	242 lb (110 kg)	Nov 13, 2019
Jordan Wilmore; C	Recruit ratings: 247Sports: ESPN: (79)				
Overall recruit ranking:
Note: In many cases, Scout, Rivals, 247Sports, On3, and ESPN may conflict in their listings of height and weight.; In these cases, the average was taken. ESPN grades are on a 100-point scale.; Sources:

=== Incoming transfers ===
Name	Number	Pos.	Height	Weight	Year	Hometown	Notes
Ed Chang	11	F	6'8"	215	Junior	Papillion, NE	Transfer from Salt Lake City Community College
Drew Buggs	2	G	6'3"	195	RS Senior	Long Beach, CA	Graduate Transfer from Hawaii

== Roster ==
2020–21 Missouri Tigers men's basketball team
Players
Coaches

Pos.	#	Name	Height	Weight	Year	Previous school	Hometown
G	0	Torrence Watson	6 ft 5 in (1.96 m)	205 lb (93 kg)	Jr	Whitfield School	St. Louis, MO
G	1	Xavier Pinson	6 ft 2 in (1.88 m)	170 lb (77 kg)	Jr	Simeon Career Academy	Chicago, IL
G	2	Drew Buggs	6 ft 3 in (1.91 m)	195 lb (88 kg)	RS Sr	Long Beach Poly High School; Hawaii	Long Beach, CA
G	4	Javon Pickett	6 ft 5 in (1.96 m)	220 lb (100 kg)	Jr	Belleville East High School	Belleville, IL
F	5	Mitchell Smith	6 ft 10 in (2.08 m)	221 lb (100 kg)	RS Sr	Van Buren High School	Van Buren, AR
F	11	Ed Chang	6 ft 8 in (2.03 m)	215 lb (98 kg)	Jr	Garfield High School; Salt Lake City Community College	Papillion, NE
G	12	Dru Smith	6 ft 3 in (1.91 m)	203 lb (92 kg)	RS Sr	Reitz Memorial High School; Evansville	Evansville, IN
G	13	Mark Smith	6 ft 5 in (1.96 m)	220 lb (100 kg)	Sr	Edwardsville High School; Illinois	Edwardsville, IL
F	15	Sean Durugordon	6 ft 7 in (2.01 m)	215 lb (98 kg)	Fr	Putnam Science Academy	Queens, NY
C	23	Jeremiah Tilmon	6 ft 10 in (2.08 m)	260 lb (118 kg)	Sr	East St. Louis High School	East St. Louis, IL
F	24	Kobe Brown	6 ft 7 in (2.01 m)	240 lb (109 kg)	So	Lee High School	Huntsville, AL
C	32	Jordan Wilmore	7 ft 3 in (2.21 m)	245 lb (111 kg)	Fr	The Skill Factory Prep School	Laurel, MD
F	42	Parker Braun	6 ft 8 in (2.03 m)	217 lb (98 kg)	RS So	Blue Valley Northwest High School	Overland Park, KS

Head coach

- Cuonzo Martin (Purdue)

Assistant coach(es)

- Chris Hollender (Evansville)
- Cornell Mann (Akron)
- Marco Harris (Southwestern Oklahoma State)

Legend

- (C) Team captain
- (S) Suspended
- (I) Ineligible
- (W) Walk-on
- Injured
- Current redshirt

Roster
Last update: June 9, 2020

== Schedule and results ==
Date time, TV	Rank^{#}	Opponent^{#}	Result	Record	High points	High rebounds	High assists	Site (attendance) city, state
Regular Season
November 25, 2020*; 6:00 pm, SECN+		Oral Roberts	W 91–64	1–0	18 – Ma. Smith	12 – Tilmon	6 – D. Smith	Mizzou Arena (0); Columbia, MO
December 2, 2020*; 8:00 pm, FS1		vs. No. 21 Oregon	W 83–75	2–0	22 – Pinson	9 – Tilmon	4 – D. Smith	CHI Health Center (89); Omaha, NE
December 6, 2020*; 1:00 pm, ESPN2		at Wichita State	W 72–62	3–0	19 – Ma. Smith	7 – Brown	6 – Pinson	Charles Koch Arena (100); Wichita, KS
December 9, 2020*; 7:15 pm, SECN		Liberty	W 69–60	4–0	17 – Ma. Smith	9 – Tilmon	5 – Buggs	Mizzou Arena (0); Columbia, MO
December 12, 2020*; 7:00 pm, ESPNU		No. 6 Illinois; Braggin' Rights	W 81–78	5–0	17 – Tied	8 – Brown	5 – Pinson	Mizzou Arena (578); Columbia, MO
December 18, 2020*; 7:00 pm, SECN+	No. 16	Prairie View A&M	Cancelled due to COVID-19 issues within Prairie View A&M.					Mizzou Arena; Columbia, MO
December 22, 2020*; 6:00 pm, SECN	No. 14	Bradley	W 54–53	6–0	15 – Pinson	10 – Tilmon	3 – Pickett	Mizzou Arena (2,956); Columbia, MO
December 30, 2020; 8:00 pm, SECN	No. 12	No. 7 Tennessee	L 53–73	6–1 (0–1)	11 – Pinson	6 – Mi. Smith	2 – Tied	Mizzou Arena (3,164); Columbia, MO
January 2, 2021; 11:00 am, CBS	No. 12	at Arkansas	W 81–68	7–1 (1–1)	25 – Tilmon	11 – Tilmon	4 – Tied	Bud Walton Arena (4,400); Fayetteville, AR
January 5, 2021; 8:00 pm, SECN	No. 13	at Mississippi State	L 63–78	7–2 (1–2)	16 – Tilmon	6 – Tilmon	8 – Pinson	Humphrey Coliseum (1,000); Starkville, MS
January 12, 2021; 8:00 pm, SECN	No. 17	Vanderbilt	Cancelled due to COVID-19 issues within Vanderbilt.					Mizzou Arena; Columbia, MO
January 16, 2021; 12:00 pm, SECN	No. 17	at Texas A&M	W 68–52	8–2 (2–2)	15 – D. Smith	10 – Tilmon	6 – D. Smith	Reed Arena (1,548); College Station, TX
January 19, 2021; 6:00 pm, SECN	No. 19	South Carolina	W 81–70	9–2 (3–2)	19 – Tilmon	10 – Tilmon	4 – Buggs	Mizzou Arena (0); Columbia, MO
January 23, 2021; 7:30 pm, SECN	No. 19	at No. 6 Tennessee	W 73–64	10–2 (4–2)	27 – Pinson	7 – Brown	3 – Buggs	Thompson-Boling Arena (4,191); Knoxville, TN
January 26, 2021; 8:00 pm, ESPNU	No. 12	at Auburn	L 82–88	10–3 (4–3)	21 – Tied	10 – Tilmon	4 – Pinson	Auburn Arena (1,824); Auburn, AL
January 30, 2021*; 1:00 pm, ESPNU	No. 12	TCU; Big 12/SEC Challenge	W 102–98 ^{OT}	11–3	36 – Pinson	13 – Brown	5 – D. Smith	Mizzou Arena (3,063); Columbia, MO
February 3, 2021; 6:00 pm, ESPN2	No. 18	Kentucky	W 75–70	12–3 (5–3)	26 – D. Smith	12 – Mi. Smith	5 – D. Smith	Mizzou Arena (3,033); Columbia, MO
February 6, 2021; 11:00 am, ESPN	No. 18	No. 10 Alabama	W 68–65	13–3 (6–3)	16 – D. Smith	9 – Brown	4 – D. Smith	Mizzou Arena (3,113); Columbia, MO
February 10, 2021; 8:00 pm, SECN	No. 10	at Ole Miss	L 59–80	13–4 (6–4)	17 – D. Smith	6 – Tilmon	3 – Tied	The Pavilion at Ole Miss (895); Oxford, MS
February 13, 2021; 3:00 pm, ESPN2	No. 10	Arkansas	L 81–86 ^{OT}	13–5 (6–5)	23 – Pinson	9 – Brown	7 – D. Smith	Mizzou Arena (3,111); Columbia, MO
February 16, 2021; 6:00 pm, SECN	No. 20	at Georgia	L 70–80	13–6 (6–6)	21 – Brown	7 – Ma. Smith	4 – Pinson	Stegeman Coliseum (1,638); Athens, GA
February 20, 2021; 1:00 pm, ESPN2	No. 20	at South Carolina	W 93–78	14–6 (7–6)	17 – Tied	6 – Brown	7 – D. Smith	Colonial Life Arena (3,176); Columbia, SC
February 23, 2021; 8:00 pm, SECN	No. 24	Ole Miss	L 53–60	14–7 (7–7)	12 – Brown	10 – Tilmon	6 – D. Smith	Mizzou Arena (2,995); Columbia, MO
February 27, 2021; 5:00 pm, SECN	No. 24	Texas A&M	Cancelled due to COVID-19 issues within Texas A&M.					Mizzou Arena; Columbia, MO
March 3, 2021; 5:30 pm, SECN		at Florida	W 72–70	15–7 (8–7)	17 – D. Smith	6 – Mi. Smith	9 – D. Smith	O'Connell Center (2,306); Gainesville, FL
March 6, 2021; 2:00 pm, SECN		LSU	L 80–86	15–8 (8–8)	17 – D. Smith	10 – Brown	4 – D. Smith	Mizzou Arena (3,112); Columbia, MO
SEC Tournament
March 11, 2021; 6:00 pm, SECN	(7)	vs. (10) Georgia; Second round	W 73–70	16–8	17 – Pinson	8 – D. Smith	4 – Brown	Bridgestone Arena (1,809); Nashville, TN
March 12, 2021; 6:00 pm, SECN	(7)	vs. (2) No. 8 Arkansas; Quarterfinals	L 64–70	16–9	14 – Pinson	11 – Brown	5 – D. Smith	Bridgestone Arena (2,155); Nashville, TN
NCAA tournament
March 20, 2021; 6:25 pm, TNT	(9 W)	vs. (8 W) Oklahoma; First Round	L 68–72	16–10	22 – D. Smith	12 – Tilmon	5 – Pinson	Lucas Oil Stadium (5764); Indianapolis, IN
*Non-conference game. ^{#}Rankings from AP Poll. (#) Tournament seedings in parentheses. All times are in Central Time.

== Rankings ==
Ranking movements Legend: ██ Increase in ranking ██ Decrease in ranking — = Not ranked RV = Received votes
	Week																	
Poll	Pre	1	2	3	4	5	6	7	8	9	10	11	12	13	14	15	16	Final
AP	—	—	RV	16	14	12	13	17	19	12	18	10	20	24	RV	—	RV	Not released
Coaches	—	—*	—	18	14	12	13	16	19	12	17	10	19	RV	RV	—	RV	—

*Coaches did not release a week 1 poll.
