= 2020–21 Vanderbilt Commodores men's basketball team =

American college basketball season

2020–21 Vanderbilt Commodores men's basketball
- Conference: Southeastern Conference
- Record: 9–16 (3–13 SEC)
- Head coach: Jerry Stackhouse (2nd season)
- Assistant coaches: Damany Hendrix; Adam Mazarei; Faragi Phillips
- Home arena: Memorial Gymnasium

2020–21 Southeastern Conference men's basketball standings
	Conf.				Overall
Team	W		L	PCT	W		L	PCT
No. 5 Alabama†	16	–	2	.889	26	–	7	.788
No. 10 Arkansas	13	–	4	.765	25	–	7	.781
LSU	11	–	6	.647	19	–	10	.655
Tennessee	10	–	7	.588	18	–	9	.667
Florida	9	–	7	.563	15	–	10	.600
Ole Miss	10	–	8	.556	16	–	12	.571
Missouri	8	–	8	.500	16	–	10	.615
Kentucky	8	–	9	.471	9	–	16	.360
Mississippi State	8	–	10	.444	18	–	15	.545
Georgia	7	–	11	.389	14	–	12	.538
Auburn^{*}	7	–	11	.389	13	–	14	.481
South Carolina	4	–	12	.250	6	–	15	.286
Texas A&M	2	–	8	.200	8	–	10	.444
Vanderbilt	3	–	13	.188	9	–	16	.360
† 2021 SEC tournament winner^{*} Ineligible for postseason due to self-imposed postseason ban.

The 2020–21 Vanderbilt Commodores men's basketball team represented Vanderbilt University during the 2020–21 NCAA Division I men's basketball season. The team was led by second-year head coach Jerry Stackhouse, and played their home games at Memorial Gymnasium in Nashville, Tennessee as a member of the Southeastern Conference. In a season limited due to the ongoing COVID-19 pandemic, the Commodores finished the season 9–16, 3–13 in SEC play to finish in last place. They defeated Texas A&M in the first round of the SEC tournament, but lost to Florida in the second round.

== Previous season ==
The Commodores finished the 2019–20 season 11–21, 3–15 in SEC play to finish in last place. They lost in the first round of the SEC tournament to Arkansas.

== Offseason ==
=== Departures ===
Name	Number	Pos.	Height	Weight	Year	Hometown	Reason for leaving
Saben Lee	0	G	6'2"	183	Junior	Phoenix, AZ	Declared for 2020 NBA draft; selected 38th overall by the Utah Jazz
Matthew Moyer	13	F	6'8"	229	RS Junior	Gahanna, OH	Transferring to George Washington
Jon Jossell	21	F	5'9"	160	Senior	Arcadia, OK	Graduated
Aaron Nesmith	24	F	6'6"	213	Sophomore	Charleston, SC	Declared for the 2020 NBA draft; selected 14th overall by the Boston Celtics
Oton Jankovic	55	F	6'10"	212	Freshman	Zagreb, Croatia	Transferring to Tulane

=== 2020 recruiting class ===
College recruiting information
Name	Hometown	School	Height	Weight	Commit date
Tyrin Lawrence; PG / SG	Monticello, GA	Sunrise Christian Academy (KS)	6 ft 3 in (1.91 m)	170 lb (77 kg)	Apr 9, 2020
Tyrin Lawrence; PG / SG	Recruit ratings: Rivals: 247Sports: ESPN: (78)				
Myles Stute; SF	Washington, D.C.	Gonzaga College (DC)	6 ft 6 in (1.98 m)	220 lb (100 kg)	Sep 8, 2019
Myles Stute; SF	Recruit ratings: Rivals: 247Sports: ESPN: (79)				
Trey Thomas; PG	Durham, ON	Crestwood Preparatory College (ON)	5 ft 11 in (1.80 m)	165 lb (75 kg)	Jul 11, 2020
Trey Thomas; PG	Recruit ratings: Rivals: 247Sports: ESPN: (N/A)				
Akeem Odusipe; C	Lagos, Nigeria	Knoxville Catholic (TN)	6 ft 9 in (2.06 m)	220 lb (100 kg)	Apr 22, 2020
Akeem Odusipe; C	Recruit ratings: Rivals: 247Sports: ESPN: (77)				
Overall recruit ranking:
Note: In many cases, Scout, Rivals, 247Sports, On3, and ESPN may conflict in their listings of height and weight.; In these cases, the average was taken. ESPN grades are on a 100-point scale.; Sources:

== Roster ==
2020–21 Vanderbilt Commodores men's basketball team
Players
Coaches

Pos.	#	Name	Height	Weight	Year	Previous school	Hometown
G	0	Tyrin Lawrence	6 ft 4 in (1.93 m)	190 lb (86 kg)	Fr	Morgan County HS	Monticello, GA
F	1	Dylan Disu	6 ft 9 in (2.06 m)	220 lb (100 kg)	So	Hendrickson HS	Pflugerville, TX
G	2	Scotty Pippen Jr.	6 ft 3 in (1.91 m)	170 lb (77 kg)	So	Sierra Canyon School	Los Angeles, CA
G	3	Maxwell Evans	6 ft 2 in (1.88 m)	190 lb (86 kg)	Sr	Bellaire HS	Houston, TX
G/F	4	Jordan Wright	6 ft 6 in (1.98 m)	226 lb (103 kg)	So	The Dunham School	Baton Rouge, LA
G	5	D. J. Harvey	6 ft 6 in (1.98 m)	235 lb (107 kg)	RS Jr	Notre Dame	Bowie, MD
F	10	Myles Stute	6 ft 7 in (2.01 m)	215 lb (98 kg)	Fr	Gonzaga College HS	Washington, D.C.
G/F	11	Braelee Albert (W)	6 ft 5 in (1.96 m)	220 lb (100 kg)	So	Brentwood School	Los Angeles, CA
G	12	Trey Thomas	5 ft 11 in (1.8 m)	165 lb (75 kg)	Fr	Crestwood Prep	Durham, ON
G	13	Issac McBride	6 ft 1 in (1.85 m)	190 lb (86 kg)	RS Fr	Baptist Prep	Little Rock, AR
G	14	Isaiah Rice	5 ft 11 in (1.8 m)	189 lb (86 kg)	Sr	Park Tudor School	Indianapolis, IN
F	15	Clevon Brown	6 ft 8 in (2.03 m)	232 lb (105 kg)	RS Sr	Winston Churchill HS	San Antonio, TX
G/F	20	Max Adelman (W)	6 ft 5 in (1.96 m)	210 lb (95 kg)	Fr	The Hun School	Memphis, TN
G	33	Drew Weikert (W)	6 ft 0 in (1.83 m)	170 lb (77 kg)	Jr	Montgomery Bell Academy	Nashville, TN
F	34	Akeem Odusipe	6 ft 9 in (2.06 m)	230 lb (104 kg)	Fr	Knoxville Catholic HS	Lagos, Nigeria
F	42	Quentin Millora-Brown	6 ft 10 in (2.08 m)	229 lb (104 kg)	RS So	Rice	Lorton, VA
F/C	50	Ejike Obinna	6 ft 10 in (2.08 m)	243 lb (110 kg)	RS Jr	Virginia Academy	Enugu, Nigeria

Head coach

- Jerry Stackhouse (North Carolina)

Assistant coach(es)

- Damany Hendrix (Lamar)
- Adam Mazarei (Redlands)
- Faragi Phillips (Mississippi Valley State)

Legend

- (C) Team captain
- (S) Suspended
- (I) Ineligible
- (W) Walk-on
- Injured
- Current redshirt

Roster
Last update: February 2, 2021

== Schedule and results ==
Date time, TV	Rank^{#}	Opponent^{#}	Result	Record	High points	High rebounds	High assists	Site (attendance) city, state
Regular Season
November 27, 2020*; 11:05 a.m., SEC Network+		Valparaiso	W 77–71	1–0	25 – Pippen Jr.	11 – Disu	4 – Tied	Memorial Gymnasium (0); Nashville, TN
December 1, 2020*; 4:00 p.m., ESPN2		vs. UConn; Canceled due to positive COVID-19 test						Mohegan Sun Arena; Uncasville, CT
December 8, 2020*		SMU; Canceled due to positive COVID-19 test						Moody Coliseum; University Park, TX
December 11, 2020*; SEC Network+		North Carolina Central; Canceled due to positive COVID-19 test						Memorial Gymnasium; Nashville, TN
December 13, 2020*; 2:00 p.m., SEC Network		Mississippi Valley State	W 84–41	2–0	17 – Disu	13 – Disu	6 – Pippen Jr.	Memorial Gymnasium (25); Nashville, TN
December 16, 2020*; 12:00 p.m., SEC Network		No. 19 Richmond	L 67–78	2–1	25 – Pippen Jr.	6 – Disu	3 – Albert	Memorial Gymnasium (68); Nashville, TN
December 19, 2020*; 7:00 p.m., SEC Network		Radford	W 59–50	3–1	25 – Pippen Jr.	8 – Millora-Brown	7 – Pippen Jr.	Memorial Gymnasium (61); Nashville, TN
December 22, 2020*; 7:00 p.m., ESPN+		at Davidson	L 65–85	3–2	24 – Pippen Jr.	11 – Disu	3 – Pippen Jr.	John M. Belk Arena (0); Davidson, NC
December 27, 2020*; 3:00 p.m., SEC Network		Alcorn State	W 87–59	4–2	30 – Pippen Jr.	7 – Disu	4 – Tied	Memorial Gymnasium (56); Nashville, TN
December 30, 2020; 8:00 p.m., ESPN2		Florida	L 72–91	4–3 (0–1)	18 – Pippen Jr.	8 – Disu	6 – Pippen Jr.	Memorial Gymnasium (279); Nashville, TN
January 5, 2021; 6:00 p.m., SEC Network		at Kentucky	L 74–77	4–4 (0–2)	18 – Tied	10 – Disu	8 – Pippen Jr.	Rupp Arena (3,475); Lexington, KY
January 9, 2021; Noon, SEC Network		Mississippi State	L 81–84	4–5 (0–3)	18 – Pippen Jr.	8 – Millora-Brown	12 – Pippen Jr.	Memorial Gymnasium (101); Nashville, TN
January 16, 2021; 5:00 p.m., SEC Network		at No. 10 Tennessee	L 61–81	4–6 (0–4)	19 – Disu	5 – Tied	2 – Tied	Thompson–Boling Arena (4,191); Knoxville, TN
January 20, 2021; 6:00 p.m., ESPNU		Texas A&M	Postponed					Memorial Gymnasium; Nashville, TN
January 23, 2021; 12:00 p.m., SEC Network		Arkansas	L 71–92	4–7 (0–5)	16 – Harvey	7 – Obinna	5 – Pippen Jr.	Memorial Gymnasium (83); Nashville, TN
January 27, 2021; 5:30 p.m., SEC Network		at Florida	L 71–78	4–8 (0–6)	32 – Pippen Jr.	9 – Disu	6 – Pippen Jr.	O'Connell Center (2,404); Gainesville, FL
January 30, 2021; 7:30 p.m., SEC Network		South Carolina	W 93–81	5–8 (1–6)	29 – Evans	7 – Disu	7 – Pippen Jr.	Memorial Gymnasium (78); Nashville, TN
February 3, 2021; 7:30 p.m., SEC Network		at Texas A&M	Postponed					Reed Arena; College Station, TX
February 6, 2021; 5:00 p.m., SEC Network		at Georgia	L 70–73	5–9 (1–7)	15 – Disu	6 – Disu	5 – Pippen Jr.	Stegeman Coliseum (1,638); Athens, GA
February 9, 2021; 7:30 p.m., SEC Network		Auburn	L 67–73	5–10 (1–8)	18 – Disu	10 – Disu	4 – Evans	Memorial Gymnasium (95); Nashville, TN
February 13, 2021; 12:00 p.m., SEC Network		at Mississippi State	W 72–51	6–10 (2–8)	20 – Evans	10 – Disu	9 – Pippen Jr.	Humphrey Coliseum (0); Starkville, MS
February 17, 2021; 6:00 p.m., SEC Network		Kentucky	L 78–82	6–11 (2–9)	29 – Disu	16 – Disu	3 – Tied	Memorial Gymnasium (164); Nashville, TN
February 20, 2021; 12:00 p.m., SEC Network		at No. 8 Alabama	L 78–82	6–12 (2–10)	24 – Pippen Jr.	15 – Disu	5 – Wright	Coleman Coliseum (2,055); Tuscaloosa, AL
February 24, 2021; 8:00 p.m., SECN		No. 25 Tennessee	L 58–70	6–13 (2–11)	13 – Evans	5 – Wright	4 – Wright	Memorial Gymnasium (144); Nashville, TN
February 27, 2021; 2:30 p.m., SEC Network		Ole Miss	W 75–70	7–13 (3–11)	14 – Thomas	6 – Evans	5 – Wright	Memorial Gymnasium (253); Nashville, TN
March 2, 2021; 7:30 p.m., SEC Network		at LSU	L 68–83	7–14 (3–12)	20 – Evans	6 – Wright	3 – Evans	Pete Maravich Assembly Center (2,426); Baton Rouge, LA
March 4, 2021*; 6:00 p.m., ESPN+		at Cincinnati	W 78–64	8–14	36 – Pippen Jr.	11 – Wright	3 – Pippen Jr.	Fifth Third Arena (2,000); Cincinnati, OH
March 6, 2021; 6:00 p.m., SEC Network		Ole Miss	L 46–56	8-15 (3–13)	16 – McBride	6 – Evans	5 – Evans	The Pavilion at Ole Miss (2,017); Oxford, MS
SEC tournament
March 10, 2021; 6:00 p.m., SECN	(12)	vs. (13) Texas A&M; First round	W 79–68	9–15	22 – Pippen Jr.	5 – Tied	6 – Pippen Jr.	Bridgestone Arena (1,149); Nashville, TN
March 11, 2021; 1:30 p.m., SECN	(12)	vs. (5) Florida; Second round	L 63–69	9–16	23 – Pippen Jr.	7 – Brown	4 – Pippen Jr.	Bridgestone Arena (1,733); Nashville, TN
*Non-conference game. ^{#}Rankings from AP Poll. (#) Tournament seedings in parentheses. All times are in Central Time.
