= 2020–21 Ole Miss Rebels men's basketball team =

American college basketball season

2020–21 Ole Miss Rebels men's basketball

NIT, First Round
- Conference: Southeastern Conference
- Record: 16–12 (10–8 SEC)
- Head coach: Kermit Davis (3rd season)
- Assistant coaches: Win Case; Ronnie Hamilton; Levi Watkins
- Home arena: The Pavilion at Ole Miss

2020–21 Southeastern Conference men's basketball standings
	Conf.				Overall
Team	W		L	PCT	W		L	PCT
No. 5 Alabama†	16	–	2	.889	26	–	7	.788
No. 10 Arkansas	13	–	4	.765	25	–	7	.781
LSU	11	–	6	.647	19	–	10	.655
Tennessee	10	–	7	.588	18	–	9	.667
Florida	9	–	7	.563	15	–	10	.600
Ole Miss	10	–	8	.556	16	–	12	.571
Missouri	8	–	8	.500	16	–	10	.615
Kentucky	8	–	9	.471	9	–	16	.360
Mississippi State	8	–	10	.444	18	–	15	.545
Georgia	7	–	11	.389	14	–	12	.538
Auburn^{*}	7	–	11	.389	13	–	14	.481
South Carolina	4	–	12	.250	6	–	15	.286
Texas A&M	2	–	8	.200	8	–	10	.444
Vanderbilt	3	–	13	.188	9	–	16	.360
† 2021 SEC tournament winner^{*} Ineligible for postseason due to self-imposed postseason ban.

The 2020–21 Ole Miss Rebels men's basketball team represented the University of Mississippi in the 2020–21 NCAA Division I men's basketball season, their 111th basketball season. The Rebels were led by third-year head coach, Kermit Davis. The Rebels played their games at The Pavilion at Ole Miss in Oxford, Mississippi as members of the Southeastern Conference. They finished the season 16-12, 10-8 to finish in 6th place. They defeated South Carolina in the second round in the SEC Tournament before losing in the quarterfinals to LSU. They received an invitation to the NIT where they lost in the first round to Louisiana Tech.

== Previous season ==
The Rebels finished the 2019–20 season 15–17, 6–12 in SEC play to finish in twelfth place. They lost in the first round of the SEC tournament to Georgia.

== Offseason ==
=== Departures ===
Ole Miss Departures
Name	Number	Pos.	Height	Weight	Year	Hometown	Notes
Blake Hinson	0	G/F	6'7"	229	Sophomore	Deltona, FL	Transferred to Iowa State
Breein Tyree	4	G	6'2"	195	Senior	Somerset, NJ	Graduated
Carlos Curry	10	F	6'11"	235	RS Freshman	Albany, GA	Transferred to Northwest Mississippi CC
Franco Miller Jr.	11	G	6'2"	202	RS Freshman	Freeport, Bahamas	Transferred to Florida Gulf Coast
Bryce Williams	13	G	6'2"	178	Junior	Tampa, FL	Transferred to Oklahoma State

=== 2020 recruiting class ===
College recruiting
Name	Hometown	School	Height	Weight	Commit date
Matthew Murrell #8 SG	Memphis, TN	IMG Academy	6 ft 4 in (1.93 m)	190 lb (86 kg)	Nov 9, 2019
Matthew Murrell #8 SG	Recruit ratings: Scout: Rivals: 247Sports: ESPN: (87)				
Overall recruit ranking:
Note: In many cases, Scout, Rivals, 247Sports, On3, and ESPN may conflict in their listings of height and weight.; In these cases, the average was taken. ESPN grades are on a 100-point scale.; Sources: "Ole Miss 2020 Basketball Commitments". Rivals.; "2020 Team Ranking". Rivals.

=== Incoming transfers ===
Incoming transfers
Name	Number	Pos.	Height	Weight	Year	Hometown	Previous School	Ref.
Romello White	0	F	6'8"	235	RS Senior	Atlanta, GA	Arizona State	
Dimencio Vaughn	14	G/F	6'5"	215	RS Senior	New York, NY	Rider	
Robert Allen	21	F	6'8"	230	Junior	Orlando, FL	Samford	

== Preseason ==
=== SEC media poll ===
The SEC media poll was released on November 12, 2020.

Media poll
Predicted finish	Team
1	Tennessee
2	Kentucky
3	LSU
4	Florida
5	Alabama
6	Arkansas
7	Auburn
8	South Carolina
9	Ole Miss
10	Missouri
11	Texas A&M
12	Mississippi State
13	Georgia
14	Vanderbilt

== Roster ==
2020–21 Ole Miss Rebels men's basketball team
Players
Coaches

Pos.	#	Name	Height	Weight	Year	Previous school	Hometown
F	0	Romello White	6 ft 8 in (2.03 m)	235 lb (107 kg)	RS Sr	Wheeler HS; Arizona State	Atlanta, GA
G	1	Austin Crowley	6 ft 5 in (1.96 m)	195 lb (88 kg)	So	Sunrise Christian Academy	West Point, MS
G	2	Devontae Shuler	6 ft 2 in (1.88 m)	185 lb (84 kg)	Sr	Oak Hill Academy	Irmo, SC
F	3	Khadim Sy	6 ft 10 in (2.08 m)	238 lb (108 kg)	Sr	Oak Hill Academy; Daytona State College	Dakar, Senegal
F	4	Antavion Collum	6 ft 7 in (2.01 m)	230 lb (104 kg)	So	Bartlett HS	Memphis, TN
F	5	KJ Buffen	6 ft 7 in (2.01 m)	230 lb (104 kg)	Jr	Gainesville HS	Gainesville, GA
G	11	Matthew Murrell	6 ft 4 in (1.93 m)	200 lb (91 kg)	Fr	IMG Academy	Memphis, TN
F	12	Shon Robinson	6 ft 11 in (2.11 m)	220 lb (100 kg)	RS Fr	Eduprize (Ariz.)	Chicago, IL
G/F	14	Dimencio Vaughn	6 ft 5 in (1.96 m)	215 lb (98 kg)	RS Sr	Callaway HS (MS); Rider	New York, NY
G/F	15	Luis Rodriguez	6 ft 6 in (1.98 m)	210 lb (95 kg)	RS So	Woodstock Academy	Los Angeles, CA
F	21	Robert Allen	6 ft 8 in (2.03 m)	230 lb (104 kg)	Jr	Edgewater HS; Samford	Orlando, FL
F	23	Sammy Hunter	6 ft 9 in (2.06 m)	225 lb (102 kg)	So	British Columbia Christian Academy	Nassau, Bahamas
G	24	Jarkel Joiner	6 ft 1 in (1.85 m)	180 lb (82 kg)	RS Jr	Oxford HS; Cal State Bakersfield	Oxford, MS
G	33	John McBride (W)	6 ft 7 in (2.01 m)	214 lb (97 kg)	RS So	Memphis University School	Memphis, TN

Head coach

- Kermit Davis (Mississippi State)

Assistant coach(es)

- Win Case (Oklahoma City)
- Ronnie Hamilton (UNC Pembroke)
- Levi Watkins (NC State)
- Marshall Henderson (graduate manager) (Mississippi)

Legend

- (C) Team captain
- (S) Suspended
- (I) Ineligible
- (W) Walk-on
- Injured
- Current redshirt

Roster

== Schedule and results ==
Due to the ongoing coronavirus pandemic, the start of the season was pushed back from the scheduled start of November 10. On September 16, 2020, the NCAA announced that November 25 would be the new start date.

On November 17, the school announced that head coach Kermit Davis had tested positive for coronavirus. On November 23, the school announced that the first four scheduled games would be canceled.

Date time, TV	Rank^{#}	Opponent^{#}	Result	Record	High points	High rebounds	High assists	Site (attendance) city, state
Regular season
November 27, 2020*		Arkansas State; Justin Reed Ole Miss Classic	Canceled					The Pavilion at Ole Miss; Oxford, MS
December 5, 2020*		Memphis	Canceled					The Pavilion at Ole Miss; Oxford, MS
December 10, 2020*; 7:00 pm, SECN		Jackson State	W 80–45	1–0	23 – Shuler	6 – White	4 – Rodriguez	The Pavilion at Ole Miss (1,804); Oxford, MS
December 12, 2020*; 4:00 pm, SECN Alt.		UNC Wilmington	W 78–58	2–0	20 – White	12 – Rodriguez	6 – Shuler	The Pavilion at Ole Miss (895); Oxford, MS
December 14, 2020*; 7:00 pm, SECN		Central Arkansas	W 68–54	3–0	20 – Shuler	9 – White	4 – Tied	The Pavilion at Ole Miss (895); Oxford, MS
December 16, 2020*; 7:00 pm, CBSSN		at Middle Tennessee	W 70–51	4–0	16 – White	7 – Buffen	2 – Tied	Murphy Center (100); Murfreesboro, TN
December 19, 2020*; 1:30 pm, NBCSN		at Dayton	L 62–65	4–1	12 – Tied	14 – Rodriguez	3 – White	UD Arena (300); Dayton, OH
December 22, 2020*; 4:00 pm, SECN+		UT Martin	W 90–43	5–1	16 – Tied	9 – Rodriguez	8 – Shuler	The Pavilion at Ole Miss (875); Oxford, MS
December 29, 2020; 8:00 pm, SECN		at Alabama	L 64–82	5–2 (0–1)	20 – White	11 – White	3 – Rodriguez	Coleman Coliseum (2,055); Tuscaloosa, AL
January 2, 2021*; 5:00 pm, ESPNU		Wichita State; American/SEC Alliance	L 79–83	5–3	20 – Shuler	7 – White	4 – Tied	The Pavilion at Ole Miss (860); Oxford, MS
January 6, 2021; 8:00 pm, SECN		Auburn	W 72–61	6–3 (1–1)	13 – Sy	10 – Crowley	10 – Shuler	The Pavilion at Ole Miss (853); Oxford, MS
January 9, 2021; 5:00 pm, SECN		South Carolina	Canceled					The Pavilion at Ole Miss; Oxford, MS
January 9, 2021; 8:30 pm, SECN		LSU	L 61–75	6–4 (1–2)	10 – Crowley	5 – Rodriguez	4 – Shuler	The Pavilion at Ole Miss (895); Oxford, MS
January 12, 2021; 6:00 pm, SECN		at Florida	L 63–72	6–5 (1–3)	19 – Shuler	5 – Buffen	3 – Shuler	O'Connell Center (2,254); Gainesville, FL
January 16, 2021; 11:00 am, ESPN2		Georgia	L 74–78	6–6 (1–4)	24 – Shuler	6 – Buffen	8 – Shuler	The Pavilion at Ole Miss (870); Oxford, MS
January 19, 2021; 8:00 pm, SECN		at Mississippi State	W 64–46	7–6 (2–4)	22 – Shuler	8 – Rodriguez	5 – Buffen	Humphrey Coliseum (1,000); Starkville, MS
January 23, 2021; 2:30 pm, SECN		Texas A&M	W 61–50	8–6 (3–4)	21 – Joiner	7 – Joiner	4 – Shuler	The Pavilion at Ole Miss (895); Oxford, MS
January 27, 2021; 7:30 pm, SECN		at Arkansas	L 59–74	8–7 (3–5)	19 – Shuler	8 – White	2 – Tied	Bud Walton Arena (4,400); Fayetteville, AR
January 30, 2021; 5:00 pm, SECN		at Georgia	L 61–71	8–8 (3–6)	14 – Joiner	6 – Allen	2 – Tied	Stegeman Coliseum (1,638); Athens, GA
February 2, 2021; 6:00 pm, ESPN2		No. 11 Tennessee	W 52–50	9–8 (4–6)	15 – Shuler	7 – Shuler	4 – Rodriguez	The Pavilion at Ole Miss (895); Oxford, MS
February 6, 2021; 3:00 pm, ESPN2		at Auburn	W 86–84 ^{OT}	10–8 (5–6)	30 – White	10 – White	4 – Shuler	Auburn Arena (1,824); Auburn, AL
February 10, 2021; 8:00 pm, SECN		No. 10 Missouri	W 80–59	11–8 (6–6)	21 – Joiner	6 – Tied	4 – Tied	The Pavilion at Ole Miss (895); Oxford, MS
February 13, 2021; 5:00 pm, SECN		at South Carolina	W 81–74	12–8 (7–6)	31 – Shuler	7 – Shuler	4 – Shuler	Colonial Life Arena (3,250); Columbia, SC
February 18, 2021; 4:00 pm, SECN		LSU	Canceled due to weather concerns.					The Pavilion at Ole Miss; Oxford, MS
February 20, 2021; 5:00 pm, SECN		Mississippi State	L 56–66	12–9 (7–7)	13 – Buffen	6 – Buffen	3 – Buffen	The Pavilion at Ole Miss (895); Oxford, MS
February 23, 2021; 8:00 pm, SECN		at No. 24 Missouri	W 60–53	13–9 (8–7)	14 – Shuler	8 – White	3 – Tied	Mizzou Arena (2,995); Columbia, MO
February 27, 2021; 2:30 pm, SECN		at Vanderbilt	L 70–75	13–10 (8–8)	25 – Shuler	8 – White	2 – Tied	Memorial Gymnasium (253); Nashville, TN
March 2, 2021; 8:00 pm, ESPN		Kentucky	W 70–62	14–10 (9–8)	17 – Shuler	10 – Tied	7 – Shuler	The Pavilion at Ole Miss (895); Oxford, MS
March 6, 2021; 6:00 pm, SECN		Vanderbilt	W 56–46	15–10 (10–8)	15 – Joiner	8 – Rodriguez	3 – Joiner	The Pavilion at Ole Miss (2,017); Oxford, MS
SEC tournament
March 11, 2021; 8:30 pm, SECN	(6)	vs. (11) South Carolina; Second round	W 76–59	16–10	18 – Joiner	9 – Buffen	5 – Shuler	Bridgestone Arena (1,809); Nashville, TN
March 12, 2021; 8:30 pm, SECN	(6)	vs. (3) LSU; Quarterfinals	L 73–76	16–11	26 – Joiner	12 – White	3 – Shuler	Bridgestone Arena (2,155); Nashville, TN
NIT
March 19, 2021; 8:00 pm, ESPN2	(1)	vs. (4) Louisiana Tech; First round – Ole Miss bracket	L 61–70	16–12	22 – Joiner	10 – Rodriguez	5 – Joiner	Comerica Center (543); Frisco, TX
*Non-conference game. ^{#}Rankings from AP Poll. (#) Tournament seedings in parentheses. All times are in Central Time.

== See also ==
- 2020–21 Ole Miss Rebels women's basketball team
