= 2020–21 Tennessee Volunteers basketball team =

American college basketball season

2020–21 Tennessee Volunteers basketball

NCAA tournament, first round
- Conference: Southeastern Conference
- Record: 18–9 (10–7 SEC)
- Head coach: Rick Barnes (6th season)
- Assistant coaches: Michael Schwartz; Desmond Oliver; Kim English
- Home arena: Thompson–Boling Arena

2020–21 Southeastern Conference men's basketball standings
| | Conf. | | | | Overall |
| Team | W | | L | PCT | W | | L | PCT |
|---|---|---|---|---|---|---|---|---|
| No. 5 Alabama† | 16 | – | 2 | .889 | 26 | – | 7 | .788 |
| No. 10 Arkansas | 13 | – | 4 | .765 | 25 | – | 7 | .781 |
| LSU | 11 | – | 6 | .647 | 19 | – | 10 | .655 |
| Tennessee | 10 | – | 7 | .588 | 18 | – | 9 | .667 |
| Florida | 9 | – | 7 | .563 | 15 | – | 10 | .600 |
| Ole Miss | 10 | – | 8 | .556 | 16 | – | 12 | .571 |
| Missouri | 8 | – | 8 | .500 | 16 | – | 10 | .615 |
| Kentucky | 8 | – | 9 | .471 | 9 | – | 16 | .360 |
| Mississippi State | 8 | – | 10 | .444 | 18 | – | 15 | .545 |
| Georgia | 7 | – | 11 | .389 | 14 | – | 12 | .538 |
| Auburn^{*} | 7 | – | 11 | .389 | 13 | – | 14 | .481 |
| South Carolina | 4 | – | 12 | .250 | 6 | – | 15 | .286 |
| Texas A&M | 2 | – | 8 | .200 | 8 | – | 10 | .444 |
| Vanderbilt | 3 | – | 13 | .188 | 9 | – | 16 | .360 |
† 2021 SEC tournament winner^{*} Ineligible for postseason due to self-imposed postseason ban.

The 2020–21 Tennessee Volunteers basketball team represented the University of Tennessee during the 2020–21 NCAA Division I men's basketball season. The team was led by sixth-year head coach Rick Barnes, and played their home games at Thompson–Boling Arena in Knoxville, Tennessee as a member of the Southeastern Conference. They finished the season 18–9, 10–7 in SEC Play to finish in 4th place. They defeated Florida in the quarterfinals of the SEC tournament before losing in the semifinals to Alabama. They received an at-large bid to the NCAA tournament where they were upset in the first round by Oregon State.

== Previous season ==
The Volunteers finished the 2019–20 season 17–14, 9–9 in SEC play to finish in eighth place. They were set to take on Alabama in the second round of the SEC tournament. However, the remainder of the SEC Tournament was canceled amid the ongoing COVID-19 pandemic. All further postseason tournaments were likewise canceled.

== Offseason ==
=== 2020 recruiting class ===
College recruiting information
| Name | Hometown | School | Height | Weight | Commit date |
|---|---|---|---|---|---|
| Keon Johnson; SG | Bell Buckle, TN | The Webb School | 6 ft 4 in (1.93 m) | 185 lb (84 kg) | Aug 6, 2018 |
| Keon Johnson; SG | Recruit ratings: Scout: Rivals: 247Sports: ESPN: | | | | |
| Corey Walker Jr. PF | Jacksonville, FL | Hargrave Military Academy | 6 ft 7 in (2.01 m) | 210 lb (95 kg) | Mar 3, 2019 |
| Corey Walker Jr. PF | Recruit ratings: Scout: Rivals: 247Sports: ESPN: | | | | |
| Jaden Springer; SG | Charlotte, NC | IMG Academy | 6 ft 5 in (1.96 m) | 195 lb (88 kg) | Oct 23, 2019 |
| Jaden Springer; SG | Recruit ratings: Scout: Rivals: 247Sports: ESPN: | | | | |
Overall recruit ranking:
Note: In many cases, Scout, Rivals, 247Sports, On3, and ESPN may conflict in their listings of height and weight.; In these cases, the average was taken. ESPN grades are on a 100-point scale.; Sources: "Rivals.com 2020 Tennessee Basketball Commitments". Rivals.; "2020 Team Ranking". Rivals.

== Preseason ==
=== SEC media poll ===
The SEC media poll was released on November 12, 2020.

Media poll
| Predicted finish | Team |
| 1 | Tennessee |
| 2 | Kentucky |
| 3 | LSU |
| 4 | Florida |
| 5 | Alabama |
| 6 | Arkansas |
| 7 | Auburn |
| 8 | South Carolina |
| 9 | Ole Miss |
| 10 | Missouri |
| 11 | Texas A&M |
| 12 | Mississippi State |
| 13 | Georgia |
| 14 | Vanderbilt |

=== Preseason All-SEC teams ===
The Volunteers had two players selected to the preseason all-SEC teams.

First Team

John Fulkerson

Second Team

Yves Pons

== Roster ==
2020–21 Tennessee Volunteers men's basketball team
Players
Coaches

| Pos. | # | Name | Height | Weight | Year | Previous school | Hometown |
|---|---|---|---|---|---|---|---|
| G | 0 | Davonte Gaines | 6 ft 7 in (2.01 m) | 181 lb (82 kg) | So | Hargrave Military Academy | Buffalo, NY |
| F | 3 | Drew Pember | 6 ft 10 in (2.08 m) | 190 lb (86 kg) | So | Bearden HS | Knoxville, TN |
| G | 5 | Josiah-Jordan James | 6 ft 6 in (1.98 m) | 207 lb (94 kg) | So | Porter-Gaud School | Charleston, SC |
| F | 10 | John Fulkerson | 6 ft 9 in (2.06 m) | 215 lb (98 kg) | RS Sr | Christ School | Kingsport, TN |
| G | 11 | Jaden Springer | 6 ft 4 in (1.93 m) | 204 lb (93 kg) | Fr | IMG Academy | Charlotte, NC |
| G | 12 | Victor Bailey Jr. | 6 ft 4 in (1.93 m) | 179 lb (81 kg) | RS Jr | Oregon | Austin, TX |
| F | 13 | Olivier Nkamhoua | 6 ft 8 in (2.03 m) | 223 lb (101 kg) | So | Bishop Walsh School | Helsinki, Finland |
| F | 15 | Corey Walker Jr. | 6 ft 8 in (2.03 m) | 219 lb (99 kg) | Fr | Hargrave Military Academy | Hastings, FL |
| G | 21 | Kent Gilbert (W) | 6 ft 1 in (1.85 m) | 164 lb (74 kg) | Fr | Conley HS | Greenville, NC |
| G | 24 | Isaiah Sulack | 6 ft 5 in (1.96 m) | 170 lb (77 kg) | RS So | Bossier Parish CC | Knoxville, TN |
| G | 25 | Santiago Véscovi | 6 ft 3 in (1.91 m) | 188 lb (85 kg) | So | NBA Global Academy | Montevideo, Uruguay |
| F | 30 | Brock Jancek (W) | 6 ft 8 in (2.03 m) | 222 lb (101 kg) | Jr | Knoxville Catholic HS | Knoxville, TN |
| F | 32 | Cole Morris | 6 ft 9 in (2.06 m) | 192 lb (87 kg) | Fr | Walton HS | Marietta, GA |
| F | 33 | Uroš Plavšić | 7 ft 0 in (2.13 m) | 262 lb (119 kg) | RS So | Arizona State | Ivanjica, Serbia |
| G/F | 35 | Yves Pons | 6 ft 6 in (1.98 m) | 215 lb (98 kg) | Sr | INSEP | Fuveau, France |
| G | 45 | Keon Johnson | 6 ft 5 in (1.96 m) | 186 lb (84 kg) | Fr | The Webb School | Shelbyville, TN |
| F | 55 | E. J. Anosike | 6 ft 7 in (2.01 m) | 245 lb (111 kg) | Sr | Sacred Heart | East Orange, NJ |

Head coach

- Rick Barnes (Lenoir–Rhyne)

Assistant coach(es)

- Michael Schwartz (Texas)
- Desmond Oliver (Dominican (NY))
- Kim English (Missouri)

Legend

- (C) Team captain
- (S) Suspended
- (I) Ineligible
- (W) Walk-on
- Injured
- Current redshirt

Roster

== Schedule and results ==
Due to the ongoing COVID-19 pandemic, the start of the season was pushed back from the scheduled start of November 10. On September 16, 2020, the NCAA announced that November 25 would be the new start date.

On November 23, it was announced that head coach Rick Barnes had tested positive for COVID-19 and that the school had paused all basketball activities while further tests were conducted within the program.

| Date time, TV | Rank^{#} | Opponent^{#} | Result | Record | High points | High rebounds | High assists | Site (attendance) city, state |
Non-conference regular season
| December 8, 2020*; 6:00 pm, SECN+ | No. 12 | Colorado | W 56–47 | 1–0 | 11 – Tied | 10 – Pons | 5 – Vescovi | Thompson–Boling Arena (4,191); Knoxville, TN |
| December 12, 2020*; 12:30 pm, SECN Alt. | No. 12 | Cincinnati | W 65–56 | 2–0 | 15 – Fulkerson | 12 – Fulkerson | 3 – Tied | Thompson–Boling Arena (4,191); Knoxville, TN |
| December 15, 2020*; 7:00 pm, SECN | No. 10 | Appalachian State | W 79–38 | 3–0 | 13 – Bailey Jr. | 8 – Bailey Jr. | 4 – Vesocvi | Thompson–Boling Arena (4,191); Knoxville, TN |
| December 19, 2020*; 8:00 pm, SECN+ | No. 10 | Tennessee Tech | W 103–49 | 4–0 | 21 – Springer | 6 – Tied | 6 – Springer | Thompson–Boling Arena (4,191); Knoxville, TN |
| December 21, 2020*; 6:00 pm, SECN | No. 8 | St. Joseph's | W 102–66 | 5–0 | 18 – Bailey Jr. | 9 – Pons | 5 – Tied | Thompson–Boling Arena (4,191); Knoxville, TN |
| December 23, 2020*; 7:00 pm, SECN | No. 8 | USC Upstate | W 80–60 | 6–0 | 18 – Bailey Jr. | 8 – James | 8 – Vescovi | Thompson–Boling Arena (4,191); Knoxville, TN |
SEC regular season
| December 30, 2020; 9:00 pm, SECN | No. 7 | at No. 12 Missouri | W 73–53 | 7–0 (1–0) | 15 – Vescovi | 6 – Tied | 4 – James | Mizzou Arena (3,164); Columbia, MO |
| January 2, 2021; 6:00 pm, ESPN2 | No. 7 | Alabama | L 63–71 | 7–1 (1–1) | 16 – Bailey Jr. | 8 – Tied | 2 – Tied | Thompson–Boling Arena (4,191); Knoxville, TN |
| January 6, 2021; 7:00 pm, ESPN2 | No. 9 | Arkansas | W 79–74 | 8–1 (2–1) | 17 – Tied | 9 – James | 3 – Tied | Thompson–Boling Arena (4,191); Knoxville, TN |
| January 9, 2021; 2:00 pm, ESPN2 | No. 9 | at Texas A&M | W 68–54 | 9–1 (3–1) | 23 – Vescovi | 5 – Tied | 6 – Springer | Reed Arena (1,298); College Station, TX |
| January 12, 2021; 7:00 p.m., ESPN2/ESPNU | No. 9 | at South Carolina | Postponed | | | | | Colonial Life Arena; Columbia, SC |
| January 16, 2021; 6:00 pm, SECN | No. 10 | Vanderbilt | W 81–61 | 10–1 (4–1) | 16 – Johnson | 8 – Fulkerson | 5 – Springer | Thompson–Boling Arena (4,191); Knoxville, TN |
| January 19, 2021; 7:00 pm, ESPN | No. 6 | at Florida | L 49–75 | 10–2 (4–2) | 8 – Fulkerson | 5 – Tied | 5 – Fulkerson | O'Connell Center (2,280); Gainesville, FL |
| January 23, 2021; 8:30 pm, SECN | No. 6 | No. 19 Missouri | L 64–73 | 10–3 (4–3) | 20 – Pons | 6 – Fulkerson | 4 – Vescovi | Thompson–Boling Arena (4,191); Knoxville, TN |
| January 26, 2021; 7:00 pm, SECN | No. 18 | Mississippi State | W 56–53 | 11–3 (5–3) | 13 – Pons | 7 – Vescovi | 5 – Springer | Thompson–Boling Arena (4,191); Knoxville, TN |
| January 30, 2021*; 6:00 pm, ESPN | No. 18 | No. 15 Kansas; SEC/Big 12 Challenge | W 80–61 | 12–3 | 17 – Pons | 11 – James | 4 – Tied | Thompson–Boling Arena (4,191); Knoxville, TN |
| February 2, 2021; 7:00 pm, ESPN2 | No. 11 | at Ole Miss | L 50–52 | 12–4 (5–4) | 13 – Pons | 6 – James | 4 – Tied | The Pavilion at Ole Miss (895); Oxford, MS |
| February 6, 2021; 8:00 pm, ESPN | No. 11 | at Kentucky | W 82–71 | 13–4 (6–4) | 27 – Johnson | 10 – James | 5 – Vescovi | Rupp Arena (3,075); Lexington, KY |
| February 10, 2021; 8:00 pm, ESPN2 | No. 16 | Georgia | W 89–81 | 14–4 (7–4) | 30 – Springer | 8 – Fulkerson | 4 – Fulkerson | Thompson–Boling Arena (4,191); Knoxville, TN |
| February 13, 2021; 2:00 pm, ESPN | No. 16 | at LSU | L 65–78 | 14–5 (7–5) | 21 – Springer | 6 – Tied | 7 – Springer | Pete Maravich Assembly Center (2,224); Baton Rouge, LA |
| February 17, 2021; 9:00 pm, SECN | No. 19 | South Carolina | W 93–73 | 15–5 (8–5) | 29 – Bailey Jr. | 9 – Pons | 5 – Tied | Thompson–Boling Arena (4,191); Knoxville, TN |
| February 20, 2021; 1:00 pm, CBS | No. 19 | Kentucky | L 55–70 | 15–6 (8–6) | 18 – Bailey Jr. | 7 – Fulkerson | 5 – Johnson | Thompson–Boling Arena (4,191); Knoxville, TN |
| February 24, 2021; 9:00 pm, SECN | No. 25 | at Vanderbilt | W 70–58 | 16–6 (9–6) | 21 – Bailey Jr. | 10 – Pons | 3 – Tied | Memorial Gymnasium (144); Nashville, TN |
| February 27, 2021; 12:00 pm, ESPN | No. 25 | at Auburn | L 72–77 | 16–7 (9–7) | 23 – Johnson | 8 – Pons | 6 – Springer | Auburn Arena (1,824); Auburn, AL |
| March 7, 2021; 12:00 pm, ESPNU | | Florida | W 65–54 | 17–7 (10–7) | 14 – Tied | 10 – James | 4 – Fulkerson | Thompson–Boling Arena (4,191); Knoxville, TN |
SEC Tournament
| March 12, 2021; 2:30 p.m., ESPN | (4) | vs. (5) Florida; Quarterfinals | W 78–66 | 18–7 | 14 – Vescovi | 9 – Tied | 6 – Tied | Bridgestone Arena (2,186); Nashville, TN |
| March 13, 2021; 1:00 p.m., ESPN | (4) | vs. (1) No. 6 Alabama; Semifinals | L 68–73 | 18–8 | 20 – Johnson | 9 – Johnson | 4 – Vescovi | Bridgestone Arena (3,164); Nashville, TN |
NCAA tournament
| March 19, 2021*; 4:30 p.m., TNT | (5 MW) | vs. (12 MW) Oregon State; First Round | L 56–70 | 18–9 | 14 – Johnson | 13 – James | 3 – Springer | Bankers Life Fieldhouse; Indianapolis, IN |
*Non-conference game. ^{#}Rankings from AP Poll. (#) Tournament seedings in parentheses. All times are in Eastern Time.

== Rankings ==
Ranking movements Legend: ██ Increase in ranking ██ Decrease in ranking RV = Received votes
| | Week | | | | | | | | | | | | | | | | | | |
| Poll | Pre | 1 | 2 | 3 | 4 | 5 | 6 | 7 | 8 | 9 | 10 | 11 | 12 | 13 | 14 | 15 | 16 | 17 | Final |
|---|---|---|---|---|---|---|---|---|---|---|---|---|---|---|---|---|---|---|---|
| AP | 12 | 12 | 13 | 12 | 10 | 8 | 7 | 9 | 10 | 6 | 18 | 11 | 16 | 19 | 25 | RV | RV | RV | Not released |
| Coaches | 14 | 14^ | 16 | 10 | 8 | 8 | 6 | 8 | 10 | 6 | 17 | 10 | 15 | 20 | RV | RV | RV | RV | RV |

^Coaches did not release a Week 1 poll.
