= 2020–21 LSU Tigers basketball team =

American college basketball season

2020–21 LSU Tigers basketball

NCAA tournament, second round
- Conference: Southeastern Conference
- Record: 19–10 (11–6 SEC)
- Head coach: Will Wade (4th season)
- Assistant coaches: Kevin Nickelberry; Bill Armstrong; Tasmin Mitchell
- Home arena: Pete Maravich Assembly Center

2020–21 Southeastern Conference men's basketball standings
	Conf.				Overall
Team	W		L	PCT	W		L	PCT
No. 5 Alabama†	16	–	2	.889	26	–	7	.788
No. 10 Arkansas	13	–	4	.765	25	–	7	.781
LSU	11	–	6	.647	19	–	10	.655
Tennessee	10	–	7	.588	18	–	9	.667
Florida	9	–	7	.563	15	–	10	.600
Ole Miss	10	–	8	.556	16	–	12	.571
Missouri	8	–	8	.500	16	–	10	.615
Kentucky	8	–	9	.471	9	–	16	.360
Mississippi State	8	–	10	.444	18	–	15	.545
Georgia	7	–	11	.389	14	–	12	.538
Auburn^{*}	7	–	11	.389	13	–	14	.481
South Carolina	4	–	12	.250	6	–	15	.286
Texas A&M	2	–	8	.200	8	–	10	.444
Vanderbilt	3	–	13	.188	9	–	16	.360
† 2021 SEC tournament winner^{*} Ineligible for postseason due to self-imposed postseason ban.

The 2020–21 LSU Tigers basketball team represented Louisiana State University during the 2020–21 NCAA Division I men's basketball season. The team's head coach was Will Wade, in his fourth season at LSU. They played their home games at the Pete Maravich Assembly Center in Baton Rouge, Louisiana, as a member of the Southeastern Conference. They finished the season 19–10, 11–6 in SEC Play to finish in 3rd place. They defeated Ole Miss and Arkansas to advance to the championship game of the SEC tournament where they lost to Alabama. They received an at-large bid to the NCAA tournament where they defeated St. Bonaventure in the First Round before losing in the Second Round to Michigan.

== Previous season ==
The Tigers finished the season 21–10, 12–6 in SEC play to finish in a tie for second place. They were set to be the No. 3 seed in the SEC Tournament with a bye to the quarterfinals. However, the SEC Tournament and all other postseason tournaments were cancelled amid the COVID-19 pandemic.

== Offseason ==
=== Departures ===
Name	Number	Pos.	Height	Weight	Year	Hometown	Reason for departure
Skylar Mays	4	G	6'4"	205	Senior	Baton Rouge, LA	Graduated; selected 50th overall by the Atlanta Hawks
Emmitt Williams	5	F	6'6"	230	Sophomore	Fort Myers, FL	Declared for the 2020 NBA draft
James Bishop	10	G	6'2"	190	Freshman	Baltimore, MD	Transferred to George Washington
Marshall Graves	12	G	6'4"	195	Senior	Ponchatoula, LA	Graduated
Marlon Taylor	14	G	6'6"	210	Senior	Mount Vernon, New York	Graduated
Caleb Starks	20	G	6'3"	205	Junior	Lafayette, LA	Walk-on; Transferred to Tarleton State
Courtese Cooper	21	F	6'9"	220	Sophomore	Elgin, IL	Transferred to Southern Utah

=== Incoming transfers ===
Name	Number	Pos.	Height	Weight	Year	Hometown	Previous School
Josh LeBlanc Sr.	11	F	6'7"	230	Junior	Baton Rouge, LA	Georgetown
Bryan Penn-Johnson	22	C	7'0"	260	Sophomore	Long Beach, CA	Washington
Shareef O'Neal	32	F	6'10"	225	Sophomore	Los Angeles, CA	UCLA

=== 2020 recruiting class ===
College recruiting information
Name	Hometown	School	Height	Weight	Commit date
Cameron Thomas; SG	Chesapeake, VA	Oscar Smith High/Oak Hill Academy	6 ft 3 in (1.91 m)	180 lb (82 kg)	Nov 18, 2019
Cameron Thomas; SG	Recruit ratings: Scout: Rivals: 247Sports: ESPN:				
Mwani Wilkinson; PF	Las Vegas, NV	Bishop Gorman High School	6 ft 6 in (1.98 m)	195 lb (88 kg)	Feb 8, 2020
Mwani Wilkinson; PF	Recruit ratings: Scout: Rivals: 247Sports: ESPN:				
Jalen Cook; PG	Walker, LA	Walker High School	6 ft 0 in (1.83 m)	185 lb (84 kg)	Jun 18, 2019
Jalen Cook; PG	Recruit ratings: Scout: Rivals: 247Sports: ESPN:				
Eric Gaines; CG	Lithonia, GA	Lithonia High School	6 ft 3 in (1.91 m)	170 lb (77 kg)	Mar 1, 2020
Eric Gaines; CG	Recruit ratings: Scout: Rivals: 247Sports: ESPN:				
Josh Gray; C	Brooklyn, NY	Putnam Science Academy	6 ft 11 in (2.11 m)	205 lb (93 kg)	Apr 18, 2020
Josh Gray; C	Recruit ratings: Scout: Rivals: 247Sports: ESPN:				
Overall recruit ranking:
Note: In many cases, Scout, Rivals, 247Sports, On3, and ESPN may conflict in their listings of height and weight.; In these cases, the average was taken. ESPN grades are on a 100-point scale.; Sources: "LSU 2020 Basketball Commitments". Rivals.; "2020 LSU Basketball Commits". Scout.; "ESPN". ESPN.; "Scout.com Team Recruiting Rankings". Scout.; "2020 Team Ranking". Rivals.

== Preseason ==
=== SEC media poll ===
The SEC media poll was released on November 13, 2020.

Media poll
Predicted finish	Team
1	Tennessee
2	Kentucky
3	LSU
4	Florida
5	Alabama
6	Arkansas
7	Auburn
8	South Carolina
9	Ole Miss
10	Missouri
11	Texas A&M
12	Mississippi State
13	Georgia
14	Vanderbilt

=== Preseason All-SEC teams ===
The Tigers had two players selected to the preseason all-SEC teams.

First Team

Trendon Watford

Second Team

Javonte Smart

== Roster ==
2020–21 LSU Tigers men's basketball team
Players
Coaches

Pos.	#	Name	Height	Weight	Year	Previous school	Hometown
F	0	Mwani Wilkinson	6 ft 5 in (1.96 m)	215 lb (98 kg)	Fr	Bishop Gorman High School	Las Vegas, NV
G	1	Javonte Smart	6 ft 4 in (1.93 m)	205 lb (93 kg)	Jr	Scotlandville Magnet HS	Baton Rouge, LA
F	2	Trendon Watford	6 ft 9 in (2.06 m)	240 lb (109 kg)	So	Mountain Brook HS	Birmingham, AL
G	3	Jalen Cook	6 ft 0 in (1.83 m)	205 lb (93 kg)	Fr	Walker High School	Walker, LA
F	4	Darius Days	6 ft 7 in (2.01 m)	245 lb (111 kg)	Jr	IMG Academy	Raleigh, FL
G	5	Parker Edwards (W)	6 ft 2 in (1.88 m)	185 lb (84 kg)	Jr	Southeastern Louisiana	Mandeville, LA
G	10	Brandon Egemo (W)	6 ft 0 in (1.83 m)	175 lb (79 kg)	Fr	University HS	Los Angeles, CA
G	11	Josh LeBlanc Sr.	6 ft 7 in (2.01 m)	230 lb (104 kg)	Jr	Georgetown	Baton Rouge, LA
F	15	Aundre Hyatt	6 ft 6 in (1.98 m)	225 lb (102 kg)	RS So	Miller School	The Bronx, NY
G	21	Charles Manning Jr.	6 ft 5 in (1.96 m)	205 lb (93 kg)	Jr	Florida SouthWestern State College	Riverhead, NY
C	22	Bryan Penn-Johnson	7 ft 0 in (2.13 m)	260 lb (118 kg)	So	Washington	Long Beach, CA
G	24	Cam Thomas	6 ft 4 in (1.93 m)	210 lb (95 kg)	Fr	Oak Hill Academy	Chesapeake, VA
G	25	Eric Gaines	6 ft 2 in (1.88 m)	155 lb (70 kg)	Fr	Lithonia High School	Lithonia, GA
F	32	Shareef O'Neal	6 ft 10 in (2.08 m)	225 lb (102 kg)	RS So	UCLA	Los Angeles, CA
C	34	Josh Gray	6 ft 11 in (2.11 m)	255 lb (116 kg)	Fr	Putnam Science Academy	Brooklyn, NY

Head coach

- Will Wade (Clemson)

Assistant coach(es)

- Kevin Nickelberry (Virginia Wesleyan University)
- Bill Armstrong (UAB)
- Tasmin Mitchell (LSU)

Legend

- (C) Team captain
- (S) Suspended
- (I) Ineligible
- (W) Walk-on
- Injured
- Current redshirt

Roster
Last update: December 4, 2020

== Schedule and results ==
Date time, TV	Rank^{#}	Opponent^{#}	Result	Record	High points	High rebounds	High assists	Site (attendance) city, state
Regular season
November 26, 2020*; 6:00 pm, ESPN+		vs. SIU Edwardsville; Billiken Classic	W 94–81	1–0	27 – Thomas	7 – Watford	9 – Watford	Chaifetz Arena (0); St. Louis, MO
November 28, 2020*; 2:00 pm, ESPN+		at Saint Louis; Billiken Classic	L 81–85	1–1	25 – Thomas	11 – Days	6 – Watford	Chaifetz Arena (0); St. Louis, MO
November 30, 2020*; 7:00 pm, SECN+		Southeastern Louisiana	W 96–43	2–1	21 – Thomas	9 – Tied	5 – Smart	Pete Maravich Assembly Center (2,008); Baton Rouge, LA
December 6, 2020*; 5:00 pm, SECN		Louisiana Tech	W 86–55	3–1	18 – Watford	8 – Days	2 – Tied	Pete Maravich Assembly Center (2,505); Baton Rouge, LA
December 14, 2020*; 11:00 am, SECN		Sam Houston State	W 88–66	4–1	25 – Smart	10 – Days	5 – Smart	Pete Maravich Assembly Center (55); Baton Rouge, LA
December 26, 2020*; 1:00 pm, SECN		Nicholls	W 86–80	5–1	29 – Thomas	9 – Watford	6 – Watford	Pete Maravich Assembly Center (2,198); Baton Rouge, LA
December 29, 2020; 6:00 pm, SECN		Texas A&M	W 77–54	6–1 (1–0)	32 – Thomas	10 – Days	6 – Smart	Pete Maravich Assembly Center (2,212); Baton Rouge, LA
January 2, 2021; 1:00 pm, CBS		at Florida	L 79–83	6–2 (1–1)	28 – Thomas	8 – Watford	3 – Watford	O'Connell Center (2,211); Gainesville, FL
January 6, 2021; 6:00 pm, SECN		Georgia	W 94–92 ^{OT}	7–2 (2–1)	26 – Thomas	11 – Days	4 – Smart	Pete Maravich Assembly Center (2,635); Baton Rouge, LA
January 9, 2021; 8:30 pm, SECN		at Ole Miss	W 75–61	8–2 (3–1)	21 – Watford	7 – Days	6 – Smart	The Pavilion at Ole Miss (895); Oxford, MS
January 13, 2021; 6:00 pm, ESPN2		Arkansas	W 92–76	9–2 (4–1)	23 – Watford	13 – Days	5 – Smart	Pete Maravich Assembly Center (2,540); Baton Rouge, LA
January 16, 2021; 7:30 pm, SECN		South Carolina	W 85–80	10–2 (5–1)	25 – Thomas	9 – Days	5 – Watford	Pete Maravich Assembly Center (2,143); Baton Rouge, LA
January 19, 2021; 8:00 pm, ESPN2		No. 18 Alabama	L 75–105	10–3 (5–2)	21 – Thomas	8 – Watford	4 – Smart	Pete Maravich Assembly Center (2,295); Baton Rouge, LA
January 23, 2021; 5:00 pm, ESPN		at Kentucky	L 69–82	10–4 (5–3)	26 – Watford	10 – Watford	3 – Smart	Rupp Arena (3,075); Lexington, KY
January 26, 2021; 8:00 pm, SECN		at Texas A&M	W 78–66	11–4 (6–3)	28 – Thomas	8 – Watford	9 – Smart	Reed Arena (1,485); College Station, TX
January 30, 2021*; 1:00 pm, ESPN2		No. 10 Texas Tech; Big 12/SEC Challenge	L 71–76	11–5	29 – Smart	9 – Days	2 – Tied	Pete Maravich Assembly Center (2,808); Baton Rouge, LA
February 3, 2021; 6:00 pm, ESPNU		at No. 10 Alabama	L 60–78	11–6 (6–4)	22 – Thomas	9 – Watford	3 – Tied	Coleman Coliseum (2,055); Tuscaloosa, AL
February 6, 2021; 1:00 pm, ESPN		No. 22 Florida	Postponed					Pete Maravich Assembly Center; Baton Rouge, LA
February 10, 2021; 8:00 pm, ESPNU		at Mississippi State	W 94–80	12–6 (7–4)	25 – Thomas	11 – Days	11 – Smart	Humphrey Coliseum (1,000); Starkville, MS
February 13, 2021; 1:00 pm, ESPN		No. 16 Tennessee	W 78–65	13–6 (8–4)	25 – Thomas	8 – Hyatt	4 – Thomas	Pete Maravich Assembly Center (2,224); Baton Rouge, LA
February 18, 2021; 4:00 pm, SECN		at Ole Miss	Postponed due to weather concerns.					The Pavilion at Ole Miss; Oxford, MS
February 20, 2021; 3:00 pm, ESPN		Auburn	W 104–80	14–6 (9–4)	27 – Thomas	11 – Watford	5 – Smart	Pete Maravich Assembly Center (2,384); Baton Rouge, LA
February 23, 2021; 6:00 pm, SECN		at Georgia	L 78–91	14–7 (9–5)	21 – Thomas	10 – Watford	3 – Tied	Stegeman Coliseum (1,638); Athens, GA
February 27, 2021; 1:00 pm, ESPN2		at No. 20 Arkansas	L 75–83	14–8 (9–6)	25 – Thomas	10 – LeBlanc Sr.	4 – Smart	Bud Walton Arena (4,400); Fayetteville, AR
March 2, 2021; 7:30 pm, SECN		Vanderbilt	W 83–68	15–8 (10–6)	23 – Thomas	13 – Watford	4 – Tied	Pete Maravich Assembly Center (2,426); Baton Rouge, LA
March 6, 2021; 2:00 pm, SECN		at Missouri	W 86–80	16–8 (11–6)	29 – Thomas	9 – Days	4 – Watford	Mizzou Arena (3,112); Columbia, MO
SEC Tournament
March 12, 2021; 8:30 pm, SECN	(3)	vs. (6) Ole Miss; Quarterfinals	W 76–73	17–8	24 – Watford	12 – Days	5 – Smart	Bridgestone Arena (2,155); Nashville, TN
March 13, 2021; 2:30 pm, ESPN	(3)	vs. (2) No. 8 Arkansas; Semifinals	W 78–71	18–8	21 – Thomas	8 – Tied	4 – Smart	Bridgestone Arena (3,164); Nashville, TN
March 14, 2021; 12:00 pm, ESPN	(3)	vs. (1) No. 6 Alabama; Championship	L 79–80	18–9	30 – Watford	12 – Days	5 – Smart	Bridgestone Arena (2,586); Nashville, TN
NCAA tournament
March 20, 2021; 12:45 pm, TNT	(8 E)	vs. (9 E) St. Bonaventure; First Round	W 76–61	19–9	27 – Thomas	11 – Tied	3 – Tied	Simon Skjodt Assembly Hall; Bloomington, IN
March 22, 2021; 6:10 pm, CBS	(8 E)	vs. (1 E) No. 4 Michigan; Second Round	L 78–86	19–10	30 – Thomas	9 – Smart	5 – Smart	Lucas Oil Stadium; Indianapolis, IN
*Non-conference game. ^{#}Rankings from AP Poll. (#) Tournament seedings in parentheses. All times are in Central Time.

Schedule Source

== Rankings ==
Ranking movements Legend: ██ Increase in ranking ██ Decrease in ranking — = Not ranked RV = Received votes
	Week																	
Poll	Pre	1	2	3	4	5	6	7	8	9	10	11	12	13	14	15	16	Final
AP	RV	RV	—	—	RV	—	RV	RV	RV	—	—	—	RV	RV	—	RV	RV	Not released
Coaches	RV	RV^	RV	RV	RV	RV	—	—	RV	—	RV	RV	RV	RV	—	—	RV	RV

*AP does not release post-NCAA Tournament rankings
^Coaches did not release a Week 2 poll
