= 2020–21 Texas A&M Aggies men's basketball team =

American college basketball season

2020–21 Texas A&M Aggies men's basketball
- Conference: Southeastern Conference
- Record: 8–10 (2–8 SEC)
- Head coach: Buzz Williams (2nd season)
- Associate head coach: Jamie McNeilly
- Assistant coaches: Devin Johnson; Lyle Wolf
- Home arena: Reed Arena

2020–21 Southeastern Conference men's basketball standings
	Conf.				Overall
Team	W		L	PCT	W		L	PCT
No. 5 Alabama†	16	–	2	.889	26	–	7	.788
No. 10 Arkansas	13	–	4	.765	25	–	7	.781
LSU	11	–	6	.647	19	–	10	.655
Tennessee	10	–	7	.588	18	–	9	.667
Florida	9	–	7	.563	15	–	10	.600
Ole Miss	10	–	8	.556	16	–	12	.571
Missouri	8	–	8	.500	16	–	10	.615
Kentucky	8	–	9	.471	9	–	16	.360
Mississippi State	8	–	10	.444	18	–	15	.545
Georgia	7	–	11	.389	14	–	12	.538
Auburn^{*}	7	–	11	.389	13	–	14	.481
South Carolina	4	–	12	.250	6	–	15	.286
Texas A&M	2	–	8	.200	8	–	10	.444
Vanderbilt	3	–	13	.188	9	–	16	.360
† 2021 SEC tournament winner^{*} Ineligible for postseason due to self-imposed postseason ban.

The 2020–21 Texas A&M Aggies men's basketball team represented Texas A&M University during the 2020–21 NCAA Division I men's basketball season. The team is led by second-year head coach Buzz Williams, and play their home games at Reed Arena in College Station, Texas as a member of the Southeastern Conference.

== Previous season ==
The Aggies finished the 2019–20 season 16–14, 10–8 in SEC play to finish in a tie for sixth place. As the No. 7 seed in the SEC tournament, they were set to take on Missouri in the second round before the remainder of the SEC Tournament was canceled due to the ongoing COVID-19 pandemic.

== Roster ==
2020–21 Texas A&M Aggies men's basketball team
Players
Coaches

Pos.	#	Name	Height	Weight	Year	Previous school	Hometown
G	0	Jay Jay Chandler	6 ft 4 in (1.93 m)	183 lb (83 kg)	Sr	Cinco Ranch High School	Katy, Texas
G/F	1	Savion Flagg	6 ft 7 in (2.01 m)	223 lb (101 kg)	Sr	Alvin High School	Alvin, Texas
G	2	Hayden Hefner	6 ft 6 in (1.98 m)	182 lb (83 kg)	Fr	Nederland High School	Nederland, Texas
G	3	Quenton Jackson	6 ft 5 in (1.96 m)	175 lb (79 kg)	Sr	College of Central Florida	Los Angeles, California
G	4	Jaxson Robinson	6 ft 7 in (2.01 m)	193 lb (88 kg)	Fr	Ada High School	Ada, Oklahoma
F	5	Emanuel Miller	6 ft 7 in (2.01 m)	208 lb (94 kg)	So	Prolific Prep	Scarborough, Ontario
F	10	Everett Vaughn	6 ft 10 in (2.08 m)	257 lb (117 kg)	So	St. Thomas High School	Bellaire, Texas
G	11	Hassan Diarra	6 ft 2 in (1.88 m)	197 lb (89 kg)	Fr	Putnam Science Academy	Queens, New York
G	13	Cashius McNeilly	6 ft 4 in (1.93 m)	191 lb (87 kg)	RS Fr	Thornlea Secondary School	Scarborough, Ontario
F	15	Jonathan Aku	6 ft 10 in (2.08 m)	263 lb (119 kg)	So	iSchool Entrepreneurial Academy	Kaduna, Nigeria
G	20	Andre Gordon	6 ft 2 in (1.88 m)	188 lb (85 kg)	Jr	Sidney High School	Sidney, Ohio
G	21	Zach Walker	6 ft 4 in (1.93 m)	203 lb (92 kg)	Jr	Deer Park High School	Deer Park, Texas
G	24	LaDamien Bradford	6 ft 4 in (1.93 m)	223 lb (101 kg)	Fr	Jonesboro-Hodge High School	Lincoln, Nebraska
F	31	Luke McGhee	6 ft 11 in (2.11 m)	247 lb (112 kg)	Jr	Clark High School	San Antonio, Texas
G	33	Jackson Young	6 ft 2 in (1.88 m)	193 lb (88 kg)	Fr	Tivy High School	Kerrville, Texas
F	45	Kevin Marfo	6 ft 8 in (2.03 m)	247 lb (112 kg)	GS	Quinnipiac	Bergenfield, New Jersey
F		Javonte Brown	7 ft 0 in (2.13 m)	250 lb (113 kg)	Fr	UConn	Toronto, Ontario

Head coach

- Buzz Williams (Oklahoma City)

Assistant coach(es)

- Jamie McNeilly (New Orleans)
- Devin Johnson (New Orleans)
- Lyle Wolf (Transylvania)

Legend

- (C) Team captain
- (S) Suspended
- (I) Ineligible
- (W) Walk-on
- Injured
- Current redshirt

Roster
Last update: May 2, 2021

== Schedule and results ==
Date time, TV	Rank^{#}	Opponent^{#}	Result	Record	Site (attendance) city, state
Non-conference regular season
November 29, 2020*; 3:00 p.m., SECN+		New Orleans	W 82–53	1–0	Reed Arena (1,114); College Station, TX
December 2, 2020*; 6:00 p.m., SECN		Tarleton State	W 73–66	2–0	Reed Arena (1,316); College Station, TX
December 6, 2020*; 3:00 p.m., SECN		Texas–Rio Grande Valley	W 81–68	3–0	Reed Arena (838); College Station, TX
December 12, 2020*; 1:00 p.m., ESPN+		at TCU	L 55–73	3–1	Dickies Arena (0); Fort Worth, TX
December 15, 2020*; 6:00 p.m., SECN+		Southeastern Louisiana	W 69–52	4–1	Reed Arena (712); College Station, TX
December 21, 2020*; 12:00 p.m., SECN		Wofford	W 70–52	5–1	Reed Arena (613); College Station, TX
SEC regular season
December 29, 2020; 6:00 p.m., SECN		at LSU	L 54–77	5–2 (0–1)	Pete Maravich Assembly Center (2,212); Baton Rouge, LA
January 2, 2021; 7:30 p.m., SECN		Auburn	W 68–66	6–2 (1–1)	Reed Arena (907); College Station, TX
January 6, 2021; 8:00 p.m., ESPNU		at South Carolina	L 54–78	6–3 (1–2)	Colonial Life Arena (3,160); Columbia, SC
January 9, 2021; 1:00 p.m., ESPN2		No. 9 Tennessee	L 54–68	6–4 (1–3)	Reed Arena (1,298); College Station, TX
January 13, 2021; 8:00 p.m., SECN		at Mississippi State	W 56–55	7–4 (2–3)	Humphrey Coliseum (1,000); Starkville, MS
January 16, 2021; 12:00 p.m., SECN		No. 17 Missouri	L 52-68	7-5 (2-4)	Reed Arena (1,548); College Station, TX
January 20, 2021; 6:00 p.m., ESPNU		at Vanderbilt	Postponed		Memorial Gymnasium; Nashville, TN
January 23, 2021; 2:30 p.m., SECN		at Ole Miss	L 50–61	7–6 (2–5)	The Pavilion at Ole Miss (895); Oxford, MS
January 26, 2021; 8:00 p.m., SECN		LSU	L 66-78	7–7 (2–6)	Reed Arena (1,485); College Station, TX
January 30, 2021*; 11:00 a.m., ESPNU		at Kansas State; Big 12/SEC Challenge	W 68-61	8–7 (2–6)	Bramlage Coliseum (942); Manhattan, KS
February 3, 2021; 7:30 p.m., SECN		Vanderbilt	Postponed		Reed Arena; College Station, TX
February 10, 2021; 6:00 p.m., SECN		Georgia	Postponed		Reed Arena; College Station, TX
February 13, 2021; 7:30 p.m., SECN		at Florida	Postponed		O'Connell Center; Gainesville, FL
February 18, 2021; 2:00 p.m., SECN		No. 8 Alabama	Postponed		Reed Arena; College Station, TX
February 20, 2021; 7:30 p.m., SECN		No. 24 Arkansas	Postponed		Reed Arena; College Station, TX
February 23, 2021; 6:00 p.m., ESPN/ESPN2		at Kentucky	Postponed		Rupp Arena; Lexington, KY
February 27, 2021; 5:00 p.m., SECN		at No. 24 Missouri	Postponed		Mizzou Arena; Columbia, MO
March 3, 2021; 7:30 p.m., SECN		Mississippi State	L 57–63	8–8 (2–7)	Reed Arena (901); College Station, TX
March 6, 2021; 4:00 p.m., SECN		at No. 12 Arkansas	L 80-87	8–9 (2–8)	Bud Walton Arena (4,400); Fayetteville, AR
SEC tournament
March 10, 2021; 6:00 p.m., SECN	(13)	vs. (12) Vanderbilt; First round	L 68–79	8–10	Bridgestone Arena (1,149); Nashville, TN
*Non-conference game. ^{#}Rankings from AP Poll. (#) Tournament seedings in parentheses. All times are in Central Time.
