= 2020–21 Mississippi State Bulldogs men's basketball team =

American college basketball season

2020–21 Mississippi State Bulldogs men's basketball

NIT, Runner-Up
- Conference: Southeastern Conference
- Record: 18–15 (8–10 SEC)
- Head coach: Ben Howland (6th season)
- Assistant coaches: George Brooks; Korey McCray; Ernie Zeigler
- Home arena: Humphrey Coliseum

2020–21 Southeastern Conference men's basketball standings
	Conf.				Overall
Team	W		L	PCT	W		L	PCT
No. 5 Alabama†	16	–	2	.889	26	–	7	.788
No. 10 Arkansas	13	–	4	.765	25	–	7	.781
LSU	11	–	6	.647	19	–	10	.655
Tennessee	10	–	7	.588	18	–	9	.667
Florida	9	–	7	.563	15	–	10	.600
Ole Miss	10	–	8	.556	16	–	12	.571
Missouri	8	–	8	.500	16	–	10	.615
Kentucky	8	–	9	.471	9	–	16	.360
Mississippi State	8	–	10	.444	18	–	15	.545
Georgia	7	–	11	.389	14	–	12	.538
Auburn^{*}	7	–	11	.389	13	–	14	.481
South Carolina	4	–	12	.250	6	–	15	.286
Texas A&M	2	–	8	.200	8	–	10	.444
Vanderbilt	3	–	13	.188	9	–	16	.360
† 2021 SEC tournament winner^{*} Ineligible for postseason due to self-imposed postseason ban.

The 2020–21 Mississippi State Bulldogs men's basketball team represented Mississippi State University during the 2020–21 NCAA Division I men's basketball season. The team was led by sixth-year head coach Ben Howland, and played their home games at Humphrey Coliseum in Starkville, Mississippi as a member of the Southeastern Conference. In a season limited due to the ongoing COVID-19 pandemic, they finished the season 18–15, 8–10 in SEC play to finish in ninth place. They defeated Kentucky in the second round of the SEC tournament before losing to Alabama in the quarterfinals. They received an invitation to the National Invitation Tournament as the fourth seed in the Saint Louis bracket. There they defeated Saint Louis, Richmond, and Louisiana Tech to advance the championship game where they lost to Memphis.

== Previous season ==
The Bulldogs finished the 2019–20 season 20–11, 11–7 in SEC play to finish in a tie for fourth place. They were set to be the No. 4 seed in the SEC tournament with a bye to the quarterfinals. However, the SEC Tournament and all other postseason tournaments were canceled due to the ongoing COVID-19 pandemic.

== Offseason ==
=== Departures ===
Name	Number	Pos.	Height	Weight	Year	Hometown	Reason for departure
Nick Weatherspoon	0	G	6'2"	185	Junior	Canton, MS	Declared for the 2020 NBA draft
Reggie Perry	1	F	6'10"	250	Sophomore	Thomasville, GA	Declared for the 2020 NBA draft; selected 57th overall by the Los Angeles Clippers
Elias King	2	F	6'8"	205	Freshman	Atlanta, GA	Transferred to Middle Tennessee
Devin Butts	4	G	6'5"	175	Freshman	Macon, GA	Transferred to Louisiana
Tate Clayton	10	G	6'2"	170	Junior	Tupelo, MS	Walk-on; left the team
Robert Woodard II	12	G	6'7"	235	Sophomore	Columbus, MS	Declared for the 2020 NBA draft; selected 40th overall by the Memphis Grizzlies
Reggie Miller	13	G	6'5"	185	Senior	Saltillo, MS	Graduated
Prince Oduro	15	F	6'8"	250	Redshirt Sophomore	Toronto, ON	Transferred to South Florida
Mitchell Storm	20	F	6'7"	200	Senior	Madison, MS	Graduated
KeyShawn Feazell	22	F	6'8"	225	Junior	New Hebron, MS	Transferred to McNeese State
Tyson Carter	23	G	6'4"	175	Senior	Starkville, MS	Graduated
E. J. Datcher	45	C	6'10"	260	Senior	Harpersville, AL	Graduated

== Roster ==
2020–21 Mississippi State Bulldogs men's basketball team
Players
Coaches

Pos.	#	Name	Height	Weight	Year	Previous school	Hometown
G/F	0	Jalen Johnson	6 ft 6 in (1.98 m)	210 lb (95 kg)	RS Sr	Louisiana–Lafayette	Baton Rouge, LA
G	1	Iverson Molinar	6 ft 3 in (1.91 m)	190 lb (86 kg)	So	Veritas Prep (CA)	Panama City, Panama
F	2	Javian Davis	6 ft 9 in (2.06 m)	245 lb (111 kg)	RS So	Alabama	Canton, MS
G	3	D. J. Stewart Jr.	6 ft 6 in (1.98 m)	205 lb (93 kg)	RS So	Riverside HS	Grace, MS
G/F	4	Cameron Matthews	6 ft 7 in (2.01 m)	220 lb (100 kg)	Fr	Olive Branch HS	Olive Branch, MS
G	5	Deivon Smith	6 ft 1 in (1.85 m)	165 lb (75 kg)	Fr	Grayson HS	Loganville, GA
G/F	11	Andersson Garcia	6 ft 7 in (2.01 m)	205 lb (93 kg)	Fr	Hamilton Heights Christian Academy	Moca, DR
F	20	Derek Fountain	6 ft 9 in (2.06 m)	210 lb (95 kg)	Fr	Holly Springs HS	Holly Springs, MS
G	21	Justin Rumph	6 ft 5 in (1.96 m)	215 lb (98 kg)	RS Jr	Southern Union State CC	Birmingham, AL
F	24	Abdul Ado	6 ft 11 in (2.11 m)	255 lb (116 kg)	RS Sr	Hamilton Heights Christian Academy	Lagos, Nigeria
G	25	Isaac Stansbury	6 ft 1 in (1.85 m)	160 lb (73 kg)	So	Greenwood HS	Bowling Green, KY
F	30	Andrew Junkin	6 ft 11 in (2.11 m)	240 lb (109 kg)	RS So	New Hope HS	New Hope, MS
F	32	Quinten Post	7 ft 0 in (2.13 m)	240 lb (109 kg)	So	Cartesius Lyceum HS	Amsterdam, Netherlands
G	33	Reggie Morris	6 ft 1 in (1.85 m)	160 lb (73 kg)	Fr	Grandview HS	Grandview, MO
F	35	Tolu Smith	6 ft 10 in (2.08 m)	245 lb (111 kg)	RS So	Western Kentucky	Bay St. Louis, MS
G/F	55	Keondre Montgomery	6 ft 7 in (2.01 m)	200 lb (91 kg)	Fr	Forest Hill HS	Jackson, MS

Head coach

- Ben Howland (Weber State)

Assistant coach(es)

- George Brooks (Mississippi State)
- Korey McCray (Mercer)
- Ernie Zeigler (Cleary)

Legend

- (C) Team captain
- (S) Suspended
- (I) Ineligible
- (W) Walk-on
- Injured
- Current redshirt

Roster
Last update: March 30, 2021

== Schedule and results ==
Date time, TV	Rank^{#}	Opponent^{#}	Result	Record	High points	High rebounds	High assists	Site (attendance) city, state
Non-conference regular season
November 25, 2020*; 7:30 p.m., CBSSN		vs. Clemson; Space Coast Challenge	L 42–53	0–1	12 – Tied	10 – T. Smith	2 – Stewart Jr.	Titan Field House (0); Melbourne, FL
November 26, 2020*; 5:00 p.m., CBSSN		vs. Liberty; Space Coast Challenge	L 73–84	0–2	20 – Tied	7 – T. Smith	5 – D. Smith	Titan Field House (0); Melbourne, FL
November 30, 2020*; 7:00 p.m., SECN		Texas State	W 68–51	1–2	23 – Stewart Jr.	8 – Davis	5 – Matthews	Humphrey Coliseum; Starkville, MS
December 4, 2020*; 7:00 p.m., SECN+		North Texas	W 69–63	2–2	16 – Stewart Jr.	9 – Ado	3 – Matthews	Humphrey Coliseum (1,877); Starkville, MS
December 8, 2020*; 8:00 p.m., SECN		Jackson State	W 82–59	3–2	21 – Molinar	12 – T. Smith	4 – Molinar	Humphrey Coliseum (1,889); Starkville, MS
December 12, 2020*; 2:00 p.m., ESPNU		vs. Dayton; Holiday Hoopsgiving	L 82–85 ^{2OT}	3–3	32 – Stewart Jr.	7 – Tied	7 – Molinar	State Farm Arena (0); Atlanta, GA
December 16, 2020*; 7:00 p.m., SECN+		Central Arkansas	W 81–65	4–3	17 – Stewart Jr.	10 – T. Smith	5 – Stewart Jr.	Humphrey Coliseum (1,000); Starkville, MS
December 21, 2020*; 8:00 p.m., SECN		Mississippi Valley State	W 87–48	5–3	18 – Molinar	12 – T. Smith	5 – Molinar	Humphrey Coliseum (1,000); Starkville, MS
SEC regular season
December 30, 2020; 6:00 p.m., SECN		at Georgia	W 83–73	6–3 (1–0)	24 – Molinar	8 – Ado	8 – 3 Tied	Stegeman Coliseum (1,638); Athens, GA
January 2, 2021; 5:00 p.m., SECN		Kentucky	L 73–78 ^{2OT}	6–4 (1–1)	19 – Stewart Jr.	12 – T. Smith	5 – Molinar	Humphrey Coliseum (1,000); Starkville, MS
January 5, 2021; 8:00 p.m., SECN		No. 13 Missouri	W 78–63	7–4 (2–1)	24 – Stewart Jr.	9 – T. Smith	4 – Stewart Jr.	Humphrey Coliseum (1,000); Starkville, MS
January 9, 2021; 12:00 p.m., SECN		at Vanderbilt	W 84–81	8–4 (3–1)	24 – Molinar	8 – Tied	4 – Stewart Jr.	Memorial Gymnasium (101); Nashville, TN
January 13, 2021; 8:00 p.m., SECN		Texas A&M	L 55–56	8–5 (3–2)	16 – Molinar	6 – Smith	4 – Tied	Humphrey Coliseum (1,000); Starkville, MS
January 16, 2021; 3:00 p.m., ESPN2		Florida	W 72–69	9–5 (4–2)	27 – T. Smith	14 – T. Smith	4 – D. Smith	Humphrey Coliseum (1,000); Starkville, MS
January 19, 2021; 8:00 p.m., SECN		Ole Miss	L 46–64	9–6 (4–3)	18 – Stewart Jr.	9 – Ado	3 – Tied	Humphrey Coliseum (1,000); Starkville, MS
January 23, 2021; 5:00 p.m., SECN		at No. 18 Alabama	L 73–81	9–7 (4–4)	27 – Stewart Jr.	9 – T. Smith	2 – Tied	Coleman Coliseum (2,055); Tuscaloosa, AL
January 26, 2021; 6:00 p.m., SECN		at No. 18 Tennessee	L 53–56	9–8 (4–5)	16 – Molinar	12 – Ado	5 – Smith	Thompson–Boling Arena (4,191); Knoxville, TN
January 30, 2021*; 5:00 p.m., ESPN2		Iowa State; Big 12/SEC Challenge	W 95–56	10–8	20 – Molinar	7 – Tied	9 – Smith	Humphrey Coliseum (1,000); Starkville, MS
February 2, 2021; 8:00 p.m., SECN		at Arkansas	L 45–61	10–9 (4–6)	10 – T. Smith	5 – T. Smith	3 – Tied	Bud Walton Arena (4,400); Fayetteville, AR
February 6, 2021; 2:30 p.m., SECN		at South Carolina	W 75–59	11–9 (5–6)	29 – Stewart Jr.	8 – T. Smith	5 – D. Smith	Colonial Life Arena (3,208); Columbia, SC
February 10, 2021; 8:00 p.m., ESPNU		LSU	L 80–94	11–10 (5–7)	24 – T. Smith	10 – T. Smith	4 – Tied	Humphrey Coliseum (1,000); Starkville, MS
February 13, 2021; 12:00 p.m., SECN		Vanderbilt	L 51–72	11–11 (5–8)	19 – Molinar	6 – Tied	6 – D. Smith	Humphrey Coliseum (0); Starkville, MS
February 18, 2021; 4:00 p.m., ESPNU		at Auburn	Postponed due to weather concerns.					Auburn Arena; Auburn, AL
February 20, 2021; 5:00 p.m., SECN		at Ole Miss	W 66–56	12–11 (6–8)	17 – Molinar	7 – Ado	6 – Stewart Jr.	The Pavilion at Ole Miss (895); Oxford, MS
February 24, 2021; 6:00 p.m., SECN		South Carolina	W 69–48	13–11 (7–8)	15 – Stewart Jr.	13 – Smith	5 – Stewart Jr.	Humphrey Coliseum (1,000); Starkville, MS
February 27, 2021; 5:00 p.m., SECN		No. 6 Alabama	L 59–64	13–12 (7–9)	15 – Stewart Jr.	13 – Smith	4 – Tied	Humphrey Coliseum (1,000); Starkville, MS
March 3, 2021; 7:30 p.m., SECN		at Texas A&M	W 63–57	14–12 (8–9)	18 – Molinar	8 – D. Smith	6 – D. Smith	Reed Arena (901); College Station, TX
March 6, 2021; 12:00 p.m., SECN		at Auburn	L 71–78	14–13 (8–10)	20 – Smith	9 – Smith	2 – Tied	Auburn Arena (1,824); Auburn, AL
SEC Tournament
March 11, 2021; 11:00 a.m., SECN	(9)	vs. (8) Kentucky; Second Round	W 74–73	15–13	21 – Molinar	11 – T. Smith	10 – Stewart Jr.	Bridgestone Arena (1,733); Nashville, TN
March 12, 2021; 11:00 a.m., ESPN	(9)	vs. (1) No. 6 Alabama; Quarterfinals	L 48–85	15–14	18 – Molinar	11 – Ado	2 – Tied	Bridgestone Arena (2,186); Nashville, TN
NIT
March 20, 2021; 4:00 pm, ESPN	(4)	vs. (1) Saint Louis; First Round – Saint Louis Bracket	W 74–68	16–14	20 – Stewart Jr.	7 – Ado	6 – Stewart Jr.	Comerica Center (751); Frisco, TX
March 25, 2021; 5:00 pm, ESPN2	(4)	vs. (2) Richmond; Quarterfinals – Saint Louis Bracket	W 68–67	17–14	22 – Stewart Jr.	11 – Ado	5 – Stewart Jr.	UNT Coliseum (935); Denton, TX
March 27, 2021; 2:00 pm, ESPN	(4)	vs. (4) Louisiana Tech; Semifinals	W 84–62	18–14	25 – Molinar	7 – Tied	4 – Stewart Jr.	Comerica Center; Frisco, TX
March 28, 2021; 11:00 am, ESPN	(4)	vs. (1) Memphis; Championship	L 64–77	18–15	19 – Matthews	11 – Ado	3 – Tied	Comerica Center; Frisco, TX
*Non-conference game. ^{#}Rankings from AP Poll. (#) Tournament seedings in parentheses. All times are in Central Time.
