= 2020–21 Southeastern Conference men's basketball season =

Collegiate basketball season

- League: NCAA Division I
- Sport: Basketball
- Teams: 14
- TV partner(s): CBS, ESPN, SEC Network

Regular Season
- Regular Season Champions: Alabama

Tournament
- Venue: Bridgestone Arena, Nashville, Tennessee
- Champions: Alabama
- Runners-up: LSU
- Finals MVP: Jahvon Quinerly, Alabama

Basketball seasons
- ← 2019–20 2021–22 →

2020–21 Southeastern Conference men's basketball standings
	Conf.				Overall
Team	W		L	PCT	W		L	PCT
No. 5 Alabama†	16	–	2	.889	26	–	7	.788
No. 10 Arkansas	13	–	4	.765	25	–	7	.781
LSU	11	–	6	.647	19	–	10	.655
Tennessee	10	–	7	.588	18	–	9	.667
Florida	9	–	7	.563	15	–	10	.600
Ole Miss	10	–	8	.556	16	–	12	.571
Missouri	8	–	8	.500	16	–	10	.615
Kentucky	8	–	9	.471	9	–	16	.360
Mississippi State	8	–	10	.444	18	–	15	.545
Georgia	7	–	11	.389	14	–	12	.538
Auburn^{*}	7	–	11	.389	13	–	14	.481
South Carolina	4	–	12	.250	6	–	15	.286
Texas A&M	2	–	8	.200	8	–	10	.444
Vanderbilt	3	–	13	.188	9	–	16	.360
† 2021 SEC tournament winner^{*} Ineligible for postseason due to self-imposed postseason ban.

The 2020–21 Southeastern Conference men's basketball season began with practices in November 2020, followed by the start of the 2020–21 NCAA Division I men's basketball season on November 25. Conference play started in late December and will end in March, after which 14 member teams will participate in the 2021 SEC tournament at Bridgestone Arena in Nashville, Tennessee. The tournament champion is guaranteed a selection to the 2021 NCAA tournament.

The season was initially slated to begin on November 10, 2020, but was postponed due to the COVID-19 pandemic, which prematurely ended the previous season and continues to affect the current one.

== Preseason ==
Tennessee was predicted to win the 2021 SEC championship in voting by a select panel of both SEC and national media members. Florida's Keyontae Johnson was the choice of the media for SEC Men's Basketball Player of the Year.

=== Media Day selections ===
Media poll
1	Tennessee
2	Kentucky
3	LSU
4	Florida
5	Alabama
6	Arkansas
7	Auburn
8	South Carolina
9	Ole Miss
10	Missouri
11	Texas A&M
12	Mississippi State
13	Georgia
14	Vanderbilt

=== Preseason All-SEC teams ===
Media
Keyontae Johnson, Florida
John Petty Jr., Alabama
BJ Boston, Kentucky
Trendon Watford, LSU
John Fulkerson, Tennessee

== Head coaches ==
Note: Stats shown are before the beginning of the season. Overall and SEC records are from time at current school.

Team	Head coach	Previous job	Season at school	Overall record	SEC record	NCAA Tournaments	NCAA Final Fours	NCAA Championships
Alabama	Nate Oats	Buffalo	2	16–15 (.516)	8–10 (.444)	0	0	0
Arkansas	Eric Musselman	Nevada	2	20–12 (.625)	7–11 (.389)	0	0	0
Auburn	Bruce Pearl	Tennessee	7	125–78 (.616)	52–56 (.481)	2	1	0
Florida	Mike White	Louisiana Tech	6	108–65 (.624)	54–36 (.600)	3	0	0
Georgia	Tom Crean	Indiana	3	27–37 (.422)	7–29 (.194)	0	0	0
Kentucky	John Calipari	Memphis	12	330–77 (.811)	151–41 (.786)	9	4	1
LSU	Will Wade	VCU	4	64–30 (.681)	35–18 (.660)	1	0	0
Mississippi State	Ben Howland	UCLA	6	98–67 (.594)	43–47 (.478)	1	0	0
Missouri	Cuonzo Martin	California	4	50–46 (.521)	22–32 (.407)	1	0	0
Ole Miss	Kermit Davis	Middle Tennessee	3	35–30 (.538)	16–20 (.444)	1	0	0
South Carolina	Frank Martin	Kansas State	9	147–119 (.553)	66–78 (.458)	1	1	0
Tennessee	Rick Barnes	Texas	6	105–64 (.621)	51–39 (.567)	2	0	0
Texas A&M	Buzz Williams	Virginia Tech	2	16–14 (.533)	10–8 (.556)	0	0	0
Vanderbilt	Jerry Stackhouse	Memphis Grizzlies (asst.)	2	11–21 (.344)	3–15 (.167)	0	0	0

== Conference matrix ==
This table summarizes the head-to-head results between teams in conference play.

	Alabama	Arkansas	Auburn	Florida	Georgia	Kentucky	LSU	Mississippi State	Missouri	Ole Miss	South Carolina	Tennessee	Texas A&M	Vanderbilt
vs. Alabama	–	1–1	0–2	0–1	0–2	0–2	0–2	0–2	1–0	0–1	0–1	0–1	0–0	0–1
vs. Arkansas	1–1	–	0–2	0–1	0–1	0–1	1–1	0–1	1–1	0–1	0–1	1–0	0–1	0–1
vs. Auburn	2–0	2–0	–	1–0	1–1	1–1	1–0	0–1	0–1	2–0	0–1	0–1	1–0	0–1
vs. Florida	1–0	1–0	0–1	–	0–2	1–1	0–1	1–0	1–0	0–1	1–0	1–1	0–0	0–2
vs. Georgia	2–0	1–0	1–1	2–0	–	0–1	1–1	1–0	0–1	0–2	2–0	1–0	0–0	0–1
vs. Kentucky	2–0	1–0	1–1	1–1	1–0	–	0–1	0–1	1–0	1–0	0–1	1–1	0–0	0–2
vs. LSU	2–0	1–1	0–1	1–0	1–1	1–0	–	0–1	0–1	0–1	0–1	0–1	0–2	0–1
vs. Miss. State	2–0	1–0	1–0	0–1	0–1	1–0	1–0	–	0–1	1–1	0–2	1–0	1–1	1–1
vs. Missouri	0–1	1–1	1–0	0–1	1–0	0–1	1–0	1–0	–	2–0	0–2	1–1	0–1	0–0
vs. Ole Miss	1–0	1–0	0–2	1–0	2–0	0–1	1–0	1–1	0–2	–	0–1	0–1	0–1	1–1
vs. South Carolina	1–0	1–0	1–0	0–1	0–2	1–0	1–0	2–0	2–0	1–0	–	1–0	0–1	1–0
vs. Tennessee	1–0	0–1	1–0	1–1	0–1	1–1	1–0	0–1	1–1	1–0	0–1	–	0–1	0–2
vs. Texas A&M	0–0	1–0	0–1	0–0	0–0	0–0	2–0	1–1	1–0	1–0	1–0	1–0	–	0–0
vs. Vanderbilt	1–0	1–0	1–0	2–0	1–0	2–0	1–0	1–1	0–0	1–1	0–1	2–0	0–0	–
Total	16–2	13–4	7–11	9–7	7–11	8–9	11–6	8–10	8–8	10–8	4–12	10–7	2–8	3–13

== NBA draft ==
PG	Point guard	SG	Shooting guard	SF	Small forward	PF	Power forward	C	Center

Player	Team	Round	Pick #	Position	School	Nationality
Joshua Primo	San Antonio Spurs	1	12	SG	Alabama	Canada
Moses Moody	Golden State Warriors	1	14	SG	Arkansas	United States
Tre Mann	Oklahoma City Thunder	1	18	PG	Florida	United States
Keon Johnson	New York Knicks	1	21	SG	Tennessee	United States
Isaiah Jackson	Los Angeles Lakers	1	22	C/PF	Kentucky	United States
Cam Thomas	Brooklyn Nets	1	27	SG	LSU	United States
Jaden Springer	Philadelphia 76ers	1	28	SG	Tennessee	United States
Herbert Jones	New Orleans Pelicans	2	35	SF	Alabama	United States
JT Thor	Detroit Pistons	2	37	PF	Auburn	United States
Sharife Cooper	Atlanta Hawks	2	48	PG	Auburn	United States
Brandon Boston Jr.	Memphis Grizzlies	2	51	SG	Kentucky	United States
Scottie Lewis	Charlotte Hornets	2	56	SG	Florida	United States
