= 2020–21 Georgia Bulldogs basketball team =

American college basketball season

2020–21 Georgia Bulldogs basketball
- Conference: Southeastern Conference
- Record: 14–12 (7–11 SEC)
- Head coach: Tom Crean (3rd season)
- Assistant coaches: Steve McClain; Chad Dollar; John Linehan
- Home arena: Stegeman Coliseum

2020–21 Southeastern Conference men's basketball standings
	Conf.				Overall
Team	W		L	PCT	W		L	PCT
No. 5 Alabama†	16	–	2	.889	26	–	7	.788
No. 10 Arkansas	13	–	4	.765	25	–	7	.781
LSU	11	–	6	.647	19	–	10	.655
Tennessee	10	–	7	.588	18	–	9	.667
Florida	9	–	7	.563	15	–	10	.600
Ole Miss	10	–	8	.556	16	–	12	.571
Missouri	8	–	8	.500	16	–	10	.615
Kentucky	8	–	9	.471	9	–	16	.360
Mississippi State	8	–	10	.444	18	–	15	.545
Georgia	7	–	11	.389	14	–	12	.538
Auburn^{*}	7	–	11	.389	13	–	14	.481
South Carolina	4	–	12	.250	6	–	15	.286
Texas A&M	2	–	8	.200	8	–	10	.444
Vanderbilt	3	–	13	.188	9	–	16	.360
† 2021 SEC tournament winner^{*} Ineligible for postseason due to self-imposed postseason ban.

The 2020–21 Georgia Bulldogs men's basketball team represented the University of Georgia during the 2020–21 NCAA Division I men's basketball season. The team was led by third-year head coach Tom Crean, and played their home games at Stegeman Coliseum in Athens, Georgia as a member of the Southeastern Conference.

== Offseason ==
=== Departures ===
Name	Number	Pos.	Height	Weight	Year	Hometown	Reason for departure
Donnell Gresham Jr.	0	G	6'3"	195	Graduate student	St. Paul, MN	Graduated
Jordan Harris	2	G	6'5"	195	Senior	Iron City, GA	Graduated
Tyree Crump	4	G	6'1"	185	Senior	Bainbridge, GA	Graduated
Anthony Edwards	5	G	6'5"	225	Freshman	Atlanta, GA	Declared for the 2020 NBA draft; selected 1st overall by the Minnesota Timberwolves
Rayshaun Hammonds	20	F	6'9"	235	Junior	Norcross, GA	Declared for the 2020 NBA draft
Rodney Howard	24	C	6'11"	245	Freshman	Ypsilanti, MI	Transferred to Georgia Tech
Amanze Ngumezi	25	F	6'9"	245	Sophomore	Savannah, GA	Transferred to Jacksonville State
Mike Peake	30	F	6'8"	220	Freshman	Chicago, IL	Transferred to Austin Peay
Stan Turnier	32	G	6'4"	185	Freshman	Louisville, KY	Walk-on; left the team

== Roster ==
2020–21 Georgia Bulldogs men's basketball team
Players
Coaches

Pos.	#	Name	Height	Weight	Year	Previous school	Hometown
G	0	K. D. Johnson	6 ft 1 in (1.85 m)	190 lb (86 kg)	Fr	Hargrave Military Academy	Atlanta, Georgia
G	2	Sahvir Wheeler	5 ft 10 in (1.78 m)	180 lb (82 kg)	So	Houston Christian HS	Houston, Texas
F	3	Christian Brown	6 ft 6 in (1.98 m)	215 lb (98 kg)	So	Oak Hill Academy	Hopkins, South Carolina
F	4	Andrew Garcia	6 ft 6 in (1.98 m)	225 lb (102 kg)	GS	Stony Brook	Bergenfield, New Jersey
G	5	Justin Kier	6 ft 4 in (1.93 m)	190 lb (86 kg)	GS	George Mason	Grottoes, Virginia
F	10	Toumani Camara	6 ft 8 in (2.03 m)	220 lb (100 kg)	So	Chaminade-Madonna Prep School	Brussels, Belgium
G	11	Jaxon Etter (W)	6 ft 4 in (1.93 m)	200 lb (91 kg)	So	Etowah HS	Woodstock, Georgia
F	12	Josh Taylor	6 ft 9 in (2.06 m)	215 lb (98 kg)	Fr	Norcross HS	Atlanta, Georgia
F	13	Jonathan Ned	6 ft 8 in (2.03 m)	215 lb (98 kg)	Jr	Eastern Florida College	Brentwood, California
G	14	Tye Fagan	6 ft 3 in (1.91 m)	195 lb (88 kg)	Jr	Upson-Lee HS	Thomaston, Georgia
G	23	Mikal Starks	6 ft 0 in (1.83 m)	185 lb (84 kg)	Jr	Eastern Florida College	Miami, Florida
F	24	P. J. Horne	6 ft 6 in (1.98 m)	230 lb (104 kg)	GS	Virginia Tech	Tifton, Georgia
F	25	Tyron McMillan	6 ft 9 in (2.06 m)	220 lb (100 kg)	So	Kilgore College	New Orleans, Louisiana

Head coach

- Tom Crean (Central Michigan)

Assistant coach(es)

- Steve McClain (Chadron State)
- Chad Dollar (South Florida)
- John Linehan (Providence)

Legend

- (C) Team captain
- (S) Suspended
- (I) Ineligible
- (W) Walk-on
- Injured
- Current redshirt

Roster
Last update: March 20, 2021

== Schedule and results ==
Date time, TV	Rank^{#}	Opponent^{#}	Result	Record	Site (attendance) city, state
Non-conference regular season
November 29, 2020*; 2:00 p.m., SECN		Florida A&M	W 85–75	1–0	Stegeman Coliseum (1,638); Athens, GA
December 2, 2020*; 7:00 p.m., SECN+		North Georgia	W 84–62	2–0	Stegeman Coliseum (1,638); Athens, GA
December 4, 2020*; 7:00 p.m., SECN		Jacksonville	W 98–65	3–0	Stegeman Coliseum (1,638); Athens, GA
December 8, 2020*; 7:00 p.m., SECN		Montana	W 63–50	4–0	Stegeman Coliseum (1,638); Athens, GA
December 12, 2020*; 7:00 p.m., SECN+		Samford	W 79–75	5–0	Stegeman Coliseum (1,638); Athens, GA
December 19, 2020*; 8:00 p.m., SECN		Cincinnati	W 83–68	6–0	Stegeman Coliseum (1,638); Athens, GA
December 22, 2020*; 7:00 p.m., SECN+		Northeastern	W 76–58	7–0	Stegeman Coliseum (1,638); Athens, GA
SEC regular season
December 30, 2020; 7:00 p.m., SECN		Mississippi State	L 73–83	7–1 (0–1)	Stegeman Coliseum (1,638); Athens, GA
January 6, 2021; 7:00 p.m., SECN		at LSU	L 92–94 ^{OT}	7–2 (0–2)	Pete Maravich Assembly Center (2,635); Baton Rouge, LA
January 9, 2021; 3:30 p.m., SECN		at Arkansas	L 69–99	7–3 (0–3)	Bud Walton Arena (4,400); Fayetteville, AR
January 13, 2021; 7:00 p.m., SECN		Auburn	L 77–95	7–4 (0–4)	Stegeman Coliseum (1,638); Athens, GA
January 16, 2021; 12:00 p.m., ESPN2		at Ole Miss	W 78–74	8–4 (1–4)	The Pavilion at Ole Miss (870); Oxford, MS
January 20, 2021; 7:00 p.m., SECN		Kentucky	W 63–62	9–4 (2–4)	Stegeman Coliseum (1,638); Athens, GA
January 23, 2021; 2:00 p.m., ESPN2		Florida	L 84–92	9–5 (2–5)	Stegeman Coliseum (1,638); Athens, GA
January 27, 2021; 7:00 p.m., ESPN2		at South Carolina	L 59–83	9–6 (2–6)	Colonial Life Arena (3,156); Columbia, SC
January 30, 2021; 6:00 p.m., SECN		Ole Miss	W 71–61	10–6 (3–6)	Stegeman Coliseum (1,638); Athens, GA
February 2, 2021; 7:00 p.m., SECN		at Auburn	W 91–86	11–6 (4–6)	Auburn Arena (1,824); Auburn, AL
February 6, 2021; 6:00 p.m., SECN		Vanderbilt	W 73–70	12–6 (5–6)	Stegeman Coliseum (1,638); Athens, GA
February 10, 2021; 7:00 p.m., SECN		Texas A&M	Postponed		Stegeman Coliseum; Athens, GA
February 10, 2021; 8:00 p.m., ESPN2		at No. 16 Tennessee	L 81–89	12–7 (5–7)	Thompson–Boling Arena (4,191); Knoxville, TN
February 13, 2021; 3:30 p.m., SECN		at No. 11 Alabama	L 82–115	12–8 (5–8)	Coleman Coliseum (2,055); Tuscaloosa, AL
February 16, 2021; 7:00 p.m., SECN		No. 20 Missouri	W 80–70	13–8 (6–8)	Stegeman Coliseum (1,638); Athens, GA
February 20, 2021; 3:30 p.m., SECN		at Florida	L 63–70	13–9 (6–9)	O'Connell Center (2,345); Gainesville, FL
February 23, 2021; 7:00 p.m., SECN		LSU	W 91–78	14–9 (7–9)	Stegeman Coliseum (1,638); Athens, GA
February 27, 2021; 1:00 p.m., SECN		South Carolina	L 70–91	14–10 (7–10)	Stegeman Coliseum (1,638); Athens, GA
March 6, 2021; 2:00 p.m., CBS		No. 8 Alabama	L 79–89	14–11 (7–11)	Stegeman Coliseum (1,638); Athens, GA
SEC tournament
March 11, 2021; 7:00 p.m., SECN	(10)	vs. (7) Missouri; Second round	L 70–73	14–12	Bridgestone Arena (1,809); Nashville, TN
*Non-conference game. ^{#}Rankings from AP Poll. (#) Tournament seedings in parentheses. All times are in Eastern Time.
