= 2023 NBA G League draft =

Basketball draft

General information
- Sport: Basketball
- Date(s): October 28, 2023

Overview
- League: NBA
- First selection: Jack White, Texas Legends

The 2023 NBA G League draft was the 23rd draft of the NBA G League. It was held on October 28, 2023. Jack White was selected by the Texas Legends as the first overall pick and had his rights traded to the South Bay Lakers.

== Key ==
Pos.	G	F	C
Position	Guard	Forward	Center

†	Denotes player who was also selected in an NBA Draft

== Draft ==
=== First round ===
Pick	Player	Pos.	Nationality	Team	College/country
1	Jack White	F	Australia	Texas Legends (traded to South Bay Lakers)	Duke
2	Teafale Lenard Jr.	G/F	United States	South Bay Lakers	Middle Tennessee
3	David Muoka	C	Hong Kong	Capital City Go-Go	UNLV
4	Javonte Perkins	G/F	United States	College Park Skyhawks	Saint Louis
5	Will Richardson	G	United States	Grand Rapids Gold	Oregon
6	Pavel Savkov	G	Russia	Birmingham Squadron	Russia
7	David Shriver	G/F	United States	Austin Spurs	VCU
8	Isiaih Mosley	G	United States	Greensboro Swarm	Missouri
9	Logan Johnson	G	United States	Oklahoma City Blue	Saint Mary's
10	Karolis Lukošiūnas	G/F	Lithuania	Salt Lake City Stars	Lithuania
11	Myles Burns	F	United States	Raptors 905	Ole Miss
12	Janiel Romer Rosario	F	United States	Mexico City Capitanes	Texas A&M–Commerce
13	Bryson Warren	G	United States	Sioux Falls Skyforce	Overtime Elite
14	Olisa Akonobi	C	Nigeria	Grand Rapids Gold	Alabama A&M
15	Walter Ellis	G	United States	Grand Rapids Gold	Grand Canyon
16	Marcus Burk	G	United States	Santa Cruz Warriors	IUPUI
17	NaNa Opuku	F	United States	Texas Legends	Mount St. Mary's
18	Maxime Carene	C	France	Texas Legends	France
19	Jamal Bey	G	United States	Westchester Knicks	Washington
20	Manny Camper	F	United States	Sioux Falls Skyforce	Siena
21	Jaycee Hillsman	G	United States	Osceola Magic	Illinois State
22	Brandon Rachal	G	United States	Rip City Remix	Tulsa
23	Elijah Harkless	G	United States	Agua Caliente Clippers	UNLV
24	Anthony Nelson	G	United States	Delaware Blue Coats	Manhattan
25	Kok Yat	F	United States	Iowa Wolves	Overtime Elite
26	Lance Thomas	F	United States	Oklahoma City Blue	South Alabama
27	Arinze Chidom	F	United States	Santa Cruz Warriors	UC Riverside
28	Jared Wilson-Frame	G	United States	College Park Skyhawks	Pittsburgh
29	Myron Gardner	F	United States	Wisconsin Herd	Little Rock
30	Wendell Green Jr.	G	United States	Maine Celtics	Auburn

=== Second round ===
Pick	Player	Pos.	Nationality	Team	College/country
1	JD Tsasa	F	United States	Texas Legends	USA
2	Scottie Lewis^{†}	G	United States	Windy City Bulls	Florida
3	Eric Williams Jr.	G	United States	Canton Charge	San Diego
4	Tray Maddox	G	United States	Osceola Magic	Western Michigan
5	–	–	–	Grand Rapids Gold	–
6	Kalob Ledoux	G	United States	Stockton Kings	Louisiana Tech
7	–	–	–	Wisconsin Herd	–
8	Sincere Carry	G	United States	Memphis Hustle	Kent State
9	Alex Hunter	G	United States	Stockton Kings	Furman
10	Sam Daniel	F	United States	College Park Skyhawks	Florida Tech
11	Nojel Eastern	G	United States	Iowa Wolves	Howard
12	David Bell	C	United States	Agua Caliente Clippers	Jacksonville
13	Stephan Hicks	G	United States	Indiana Mad Ants	Cal State Northridge
14	–	–	–	Mexico City Capitanes	–
15	Darius Mickens	G	United States	Osceola Magic	Cal State San Bernardino
16	–	–	–	Santa Cruz Warriors	–
17	Keyshawn Bryant	F	United States	Windy City Bulls	South Florida
18	Kevin McClain	G	United States	Rip City Remix	Belmont
19	Davion Warren	G	United States	Memphis Hustle	Texas Tech
20	David Sloan	G	United States	Indiana Mad Ants	East Tennessee State
21	–	–	–	Indiana Mad Ants	–
22	–	–	–	Westchester Knicks	–
23	–	–	–	Delaware Blue Coats	–
24	–	–	–	Delaware Blue Coats	–
25	Isaiah Wade	F	United States	Osceola Magic	Central Oklahoma
26	Isaac Johnson	F	United States	Salt Lake City Stars	Appalachian State
27	Denzel Mahoney	G	United States	Iowa Wolves	Creighton
28	–	–	–	Texas Legends	–
29	–	–	–	Texas Legends	–
30	–	–	–	Agua Caliente Clippers	–

=== Third round ===
Pick	Player	Pos.	Nationality	Team	College/country
1	Robert Johnson	G	United States	Motor City Cruise	Indiana
2	Kyree Walker	F	United States	Rio Grande Valley Vipers	USA
