= Overtime Elite =

Basketball league based in Georgia, US

- Current season, competition or edition: 2025/2026
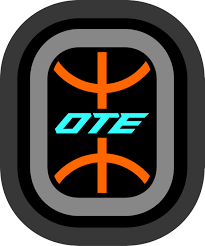
- Sport: Basketball
- Founded: 2021
- Founder: Dan Porter, Zack Weiner, and Farzeen Ghorashy
- First season: 2021–2022
- CEO: Dan Porter
- No. of teams: 9
- Country: US
- Headquarters: Atlanta, Georgia
- Venue: Overtime Elite Arena
- Most recent champion: Faze (2025–2026)
- Sponsors: Gatorade, State Farm, adidas, The Real Cost, Invisalign, Bevel, Army National Guard, Xfinity Mobile
- Website: overtimeelite.com

Overtime Elite (OTE) is a nine-team basketball league for 16–20-year-olds, based in Atlanta, Georgia. The league is owned and operated by Overtime and was founded by Dan Porter and Zack Weiner.

== History ==
Overtime launched the Overtime Elite basketball league in 2021 for American and international basketball players between the ages of 16–20. Overtime Elite is a 9-team basketball league with the top 16-20-year-old elite players from around the world. Games are primarily played at OTE Arena in Atlanta, with matches being streamed on YouTube and social media.

All players in the league will remain eligible for college as all current OTE players are on scholarship, not paid professional athletes, although they can still make money off of their Name, Image and Likeness if they choose.

In April 2021, Overtime Elite hired former NBA player and University of Connecticut head coach Kevin Ollie as its first head coach and head of player development. In May that year, the company announced the signings of Matt and Ryan Bewley, the first prep underclassmen to sign contracts with an American professional basketball league. The league also signed Dominican guard Jean Montero in June as its first international player and 16-year-old Jalen Lewis, the youngest American professional basketball player in history, in July. In October of 2021, the company announced Gatorade and State Farm as brand partners and they're still both partners today.

After the first season of Overtime Elite, the league shifted to a scholarship model so players could maintain their college eligibility. In April 2022, they announced the signing of Naasir Cunningham, who became the first Overtime Elite player to forgo being paid a salary, preserving college basketball eligibility after graduating from high school. In July that year, Pau Gasol joined Carmelo Anthony and Jay Williams on the Overtime Elite board of directors.

In October 2023, Overtime Elite agreed to a multi-year partnership for Adidas to become the league’s exclusive apparel and footwear sponsor. In February 2024, Adidas basketball announced they expanded their NIL roster by signing Overtime Elite players in Ian Jackson, Karter Knox, Mikel Brown Jr., and Adam Oumiddoch.

== Overtime Elite Arena ==
Overtime Elite built a 103,000 square-foot facility in the Atlantic Station section of Atlanta where players train, study, and compete. The building has three NBA regulation-sized courts that can seat up to 1,300 spectators. The building also has a 7,000-square-foot fitness center, a hydrotherapy room, classroom spaces, a dining hall, and locker rooms.

== Seasons ==
=== Season 1 (2021–2022) ===
Overtime Elite's inaugural season consisted of three teams – Team Elite, Team OTE, and Team Overtime – playing against each other and against prep schools and high schools. In May 2021, Overtime Elite announced the signing of Amen and Ausar Thompson, top-ranked guards in the 2022 class, and Matt and Ryan Bewley, top-ranked power forward prospects in the 2023 class.

In the league's first season, Team Elite defeated Team OTE 52–45 in Game 3 of the Overtime Elite Finals to become the first league champion. Ausar Thompson was named MVP of the Finals.

After the season, Overtime Elite's Dominick Barlow signed a two-way contract with the San Antonio Spurs, later becoming the first Overtime Elite prospect to play in the NBA on November 2, 2022. Jean Montero also signed an Exhibit 10 contract with the New York Knicks. Emmanuel Maldonado was also drafted by Mets de Guaynabo in the Baloncesto Superior Nacional League in Puerto Rico.

In the summer of 2022, a group of Overtime Elite players competed in The Basketball Tournament and traveled to Europe to compete against professional clubs Basquet Girona, KK Mega Basket, and KK Studentski centar.

=== Season 2 (2022–2023) ===
In April 2022, Overtime Elite announced the signing of top-ranked 2024 recruit Naasir Cunningham, the first Overtime Elite player to accept a scholarship instead of a salary. In July, Overtime Elite announced the signing of 8 new players for the 2022 season.

Overtime Elite announced their expansion to 6 teams for that season. Team Elite, Team OTE, and Team Overtime were rebranded as the City Reapers, YNG Dreamerz, and Cold Hearts, respectively. High school teams Hillcrest Prep Bruins, Our Saviour Lutheran Falcons, and the Word of God Holy Rams joined Overtime Elite for the second season. In the same month, Overtime Elite announced a 90-game schedule with non-league games against Bryce and Bronny James, Cameron and Cayden Boozer, and Jared McCain.

In November 2022, Overtime Elite announced the signing of top-ranked 2023 recruit Rob Dillingham after he announced his departure from Donda Academy, Kanye West's school, due to the many controversies surrounding its founder during that time.

Ausar Thompson was named regular season MVP. The City Reapers swept the YNG Dreamerz 3-0 in the Overtime Elite Finals. Ausar Thompson was also named MVP of the Finals.

After the end of the season, Amen and Ausar Thompson from the City Reapers went on to become top-5 picks in the 2023 NBA draft, with Amen drafted 4th overall by the Houston Rockets and Ausar drafted 5th overall by the Detroit Pistons. In addition to them, YNG Dreamerz players Jaylen Martin and Jazian Gortman signed deals to join NBA teams after the draft, with Martin getting a two-way contract with the New York Knicks and Gortman signing a deal as an undrafted free agent with the Milwaukee Bucks.

=== Season 3 (2023–2024) ===
Overtime Elite announced that season three will have eight teams: City Reapers, YNG Dreamerz, Rolling Loud, RWE, JellyFam, Blue Checks, Diamond Doves, and Cold Hearts.

YNG Dreamerz guard Eli Ellis was named Overtime Elite MVP after leading the league in scoring, averaging 33.4 points, 6.1 rebounds, and 5.1 assists per game. Eli scored 40 points in five games and 50 points twice.

The City Reapers would win back-to-back Overtime Elite championships, this time defeating RWE in a deciding Game 5, 71–68.

After the end of the season, former Overtime Elite prospects Alex Sarr, Rob Dillingham, Tyler Smith, and Bryson Warren would all enter the 2024 NBA draft alongside the City Reapers' Jalen Lewis, with Sarr and Dillingham both being drafted in the top 10 and Smith drafted in the second round of the draft.

=== Season 4 (2024–2025) ===
Overtime Elite announced that season four would retain eight teams: City Reapers, YNG Dreamerz, Fear of God Athletics, RWE, JellyFam, Blue Checks, Diamond Doves, and Cold Hearts, with the Fear of God Athletics effectively replacing the Rolling Loud team from the previous season.

YNG Dreamerz guard Eli Ellis was once again named Overtime Elite MVP after leading the league in scoring, averaging 32.1 points, 5.7 rebounds, and 6.7 assists per game.

The YNG Dreamerz won the Overtime Elite championships in Game 4 against the City Reapers, 93–90.

=== Season 5 (2025–2026) ===
Overtime Elite announced that season five would include a ninth and new team in FaZe.

YNG Dreamerz guard Isaac Ellis was named Overtime Elite MVP after leading the league in scoring, averaging 29.3 points and 8.9 assists per game.

FaZe won the Overtime Elite championships in Game 4 against the Cold Hearts, 100–85.

== One Shot: Overtime Elite ==
On September 5, 2023, Amazon Prime Video released One Shot: Overtime Elite, a six-episode, half-hour docuseries. The series follows seven of the top basketball players from around the country, including Amen and Ausar Thompson, as they navigate various challenges and grueling training in pursuit of a professional career in the sport.

== Notable alumni ==
The following players have gone from Overtime Elite to either a successful college program or have been successful enough to play professionally either in the NBA, the NBA G League (including the formerly rivaling NBA G League Ignite team), or overseas elsewhere.

- Izan Almansa – Signed with the NBA G League Ignite of the NBA G League in 2023; currently playing for Perth Wildcats in Australia in 2024
- Dominick Barlow – Signed as an undrafted free agent through a two-way contract with the San Antonio Spurs in 2022; current standard contract player for the Philadelphia 76ers
- Malik Bowman – Played professionally for Kouvot in Finland; currently playing for S.C. Lusitânia EXPERT in Portugal
- Kanon Catchings – Playing collegiately for University of Georgia in 2025
- Somto Cyril – Playing collegiately for the University of Georgia in 2025
- Rob Dillingham – Played collegiately for the University of Kentucky in 2023; drafted 8th overall by the San Antonio Spurs and immediately traded to the Minnesota Timberwolves in the 2024 NBA draft
- Lewis Duarte – Drafted by the Mexico City Capitanes in the 2024 NBA G League draft
- Jazian Gortman – Signed as an undrafted free agent with the Milwaukee Bucks in 2023; played for the Dallas Mavericks
- Bryce Griggs – Drafted by the Texas Legends in the 2024 NBA G League draft
- Ian Jackson – Playing collegiately for St John's University in 2025
- Karter Knox – Playing collegiately for the University of Arkansas in 2024
- Jalen Lewis – Signed with the Wisconsin Herd of the NBA G League in 2024
- Emmanuel Maldonado – Played professionally for the Mets de Guaynabo in Puerto Rico
- Jaylen Martin – Signed a two-way contract as an undrafted free agent with the New York Knicks in 2023; plays for the Washington Wizards
- Jean Montero – Played professionally for the Real Betis Baloncesto in Spain
- Alex Sarr – Signed with the Perth Wildcats in Australia in 2023; drafted 2nd overall by the Washington Wizards in the 2024 NBA draft
- Jai Smith – Drafted by the Sioux Falls Skyforce in the 2022 NBA G League draft
- Tyler Smith – Signed with the NBA G League Ignite of the NBA G League in 2023; drafted 33rd overall by the Milwaukee Bucks in the 2024 NBA draft
- Amen Thompson – Drafted 4th overall by the Houston Rockets in the 2023 NBA draft
- Ausar Thompson – Drafted 5th overall by the Detroit Pistons in the 2023 NBA draft
- Johned Walker – Playing professionally for the Indios de Mayagüez in Puerto Rico
- Bryson Warren – Drafted by the Sioux Falls Skyforce in the 2023 NBA G League draft
- Kok Yat – Drafted by the Iowa Wolves in the 2023 NBA G League draft
- Meleek Thomas – Drafted by the Cleveland Cavaliers in the 2026 NBA draft
