= 2021 NBA draft =

75th edition of the draft

General information
- Sport: Basketball
- Date: July 29, 2021
- Location: Barclays Center (Brooklyn, New York)
- Networks: ESPN; ABC (first round only)

Overview
- 60 total selections in 2 rounds
- League: NBA
- First selection: Cade Cunningham (Detroit Pistons)

The 2021 NBA draft, the 75th edition of the National Basketball Association's annual draft, was held on July 29, 2021, at Barclays Center in Brooklyn, New York. The NBA draft returned to Brooklyn after the previous year's draft was held through videoconferencing at ESPN Studios in Bristol, Connecticut due to the COVID-19 pandemic. With the first overall pick, the Detroit Pistons selected Cade Cunningham. The NBA used a "ceremonial pick" for the late Terrence Clarke, between the 14th and 15th pick of the draft.

== Draft selections ==
Cade Cunningham was selected 1st overall by the Detroit Pistons.

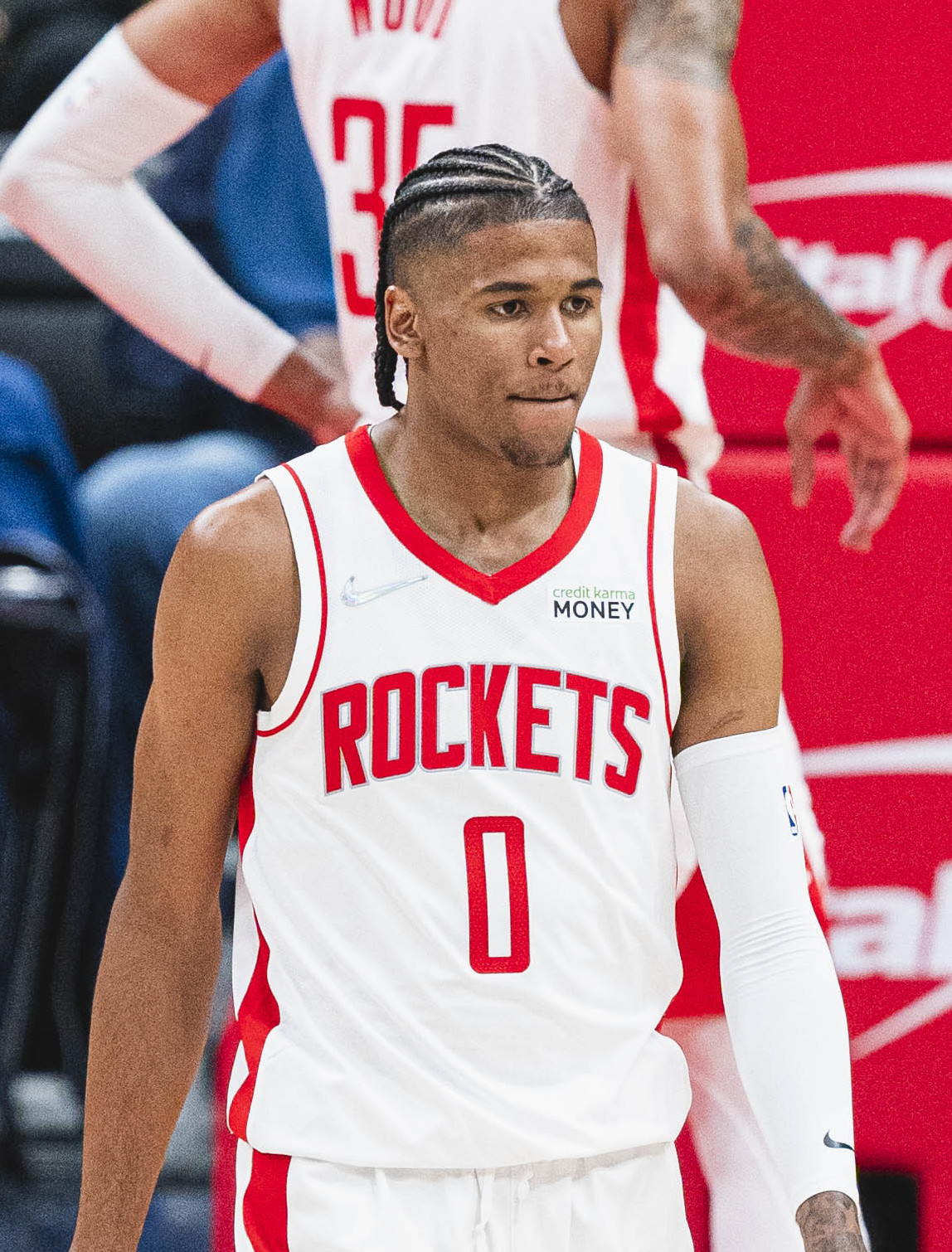
Jalen Green (NBA G League Ignite) was selected 2nd overall by the Houston Rockets.

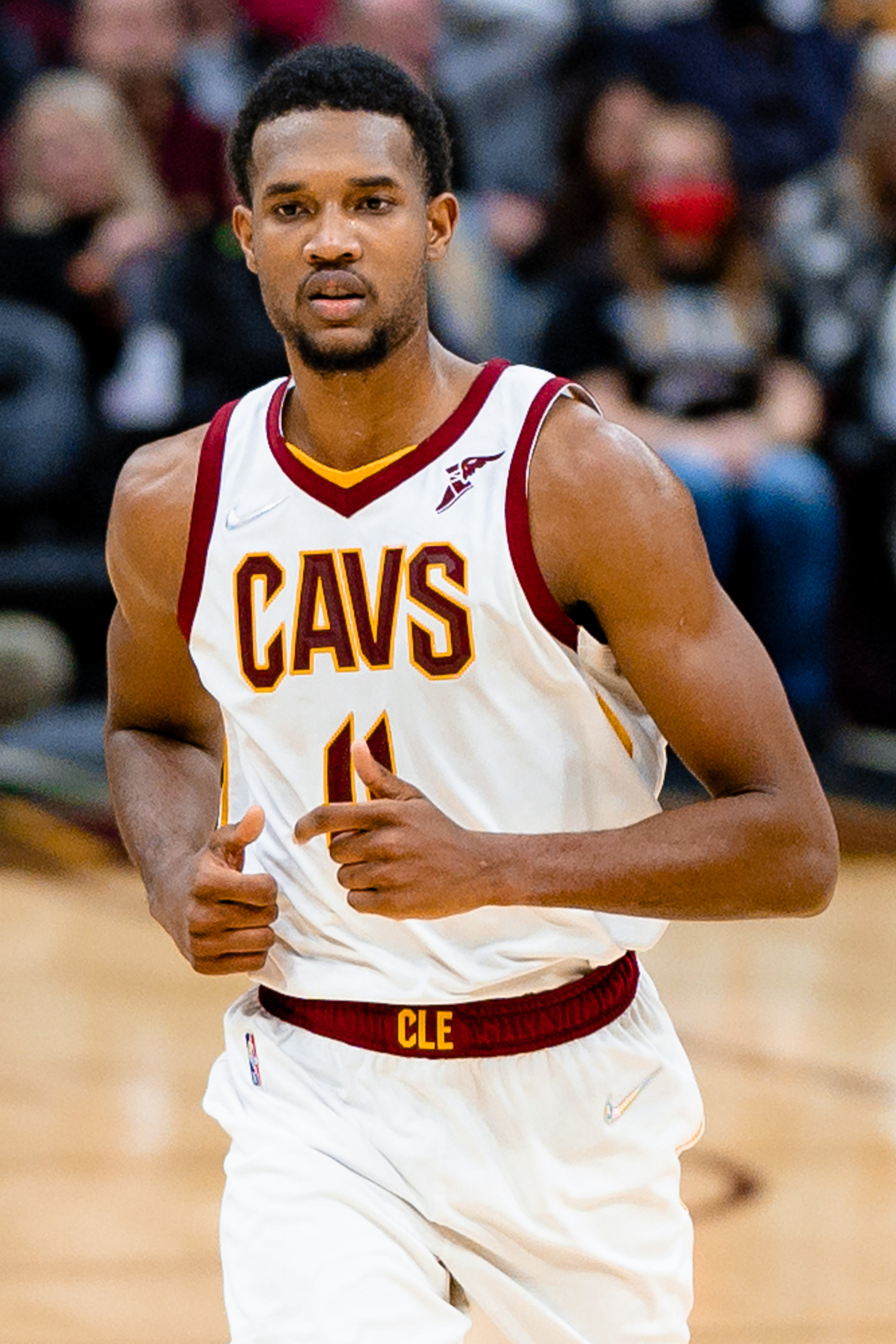
Evan Mobley was selected 3rd overall by the Cleveland Cavaliers.

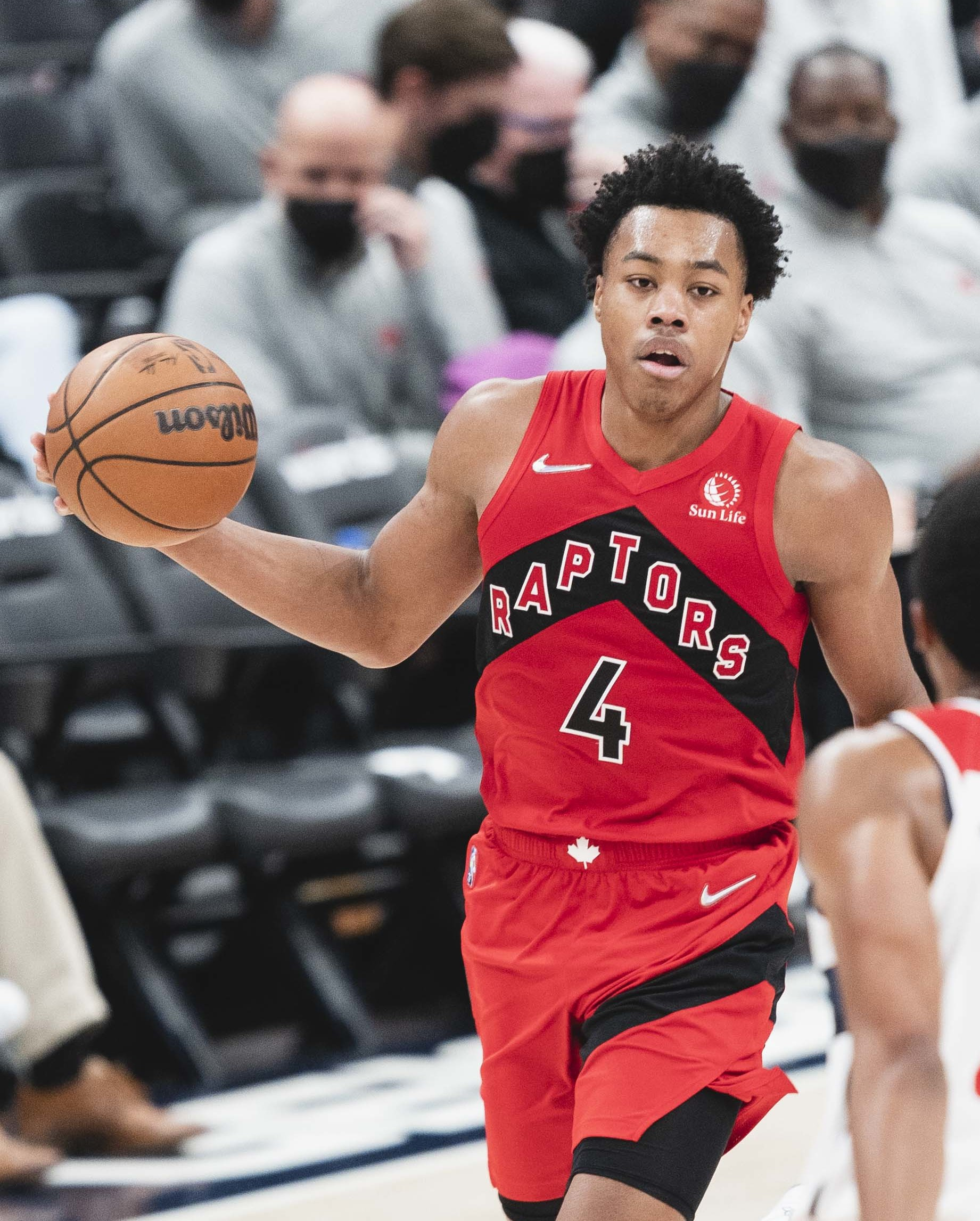
Scottie Barnes was selected 4th overall by the Toronto Raptors and voted the Rookie of the Year.

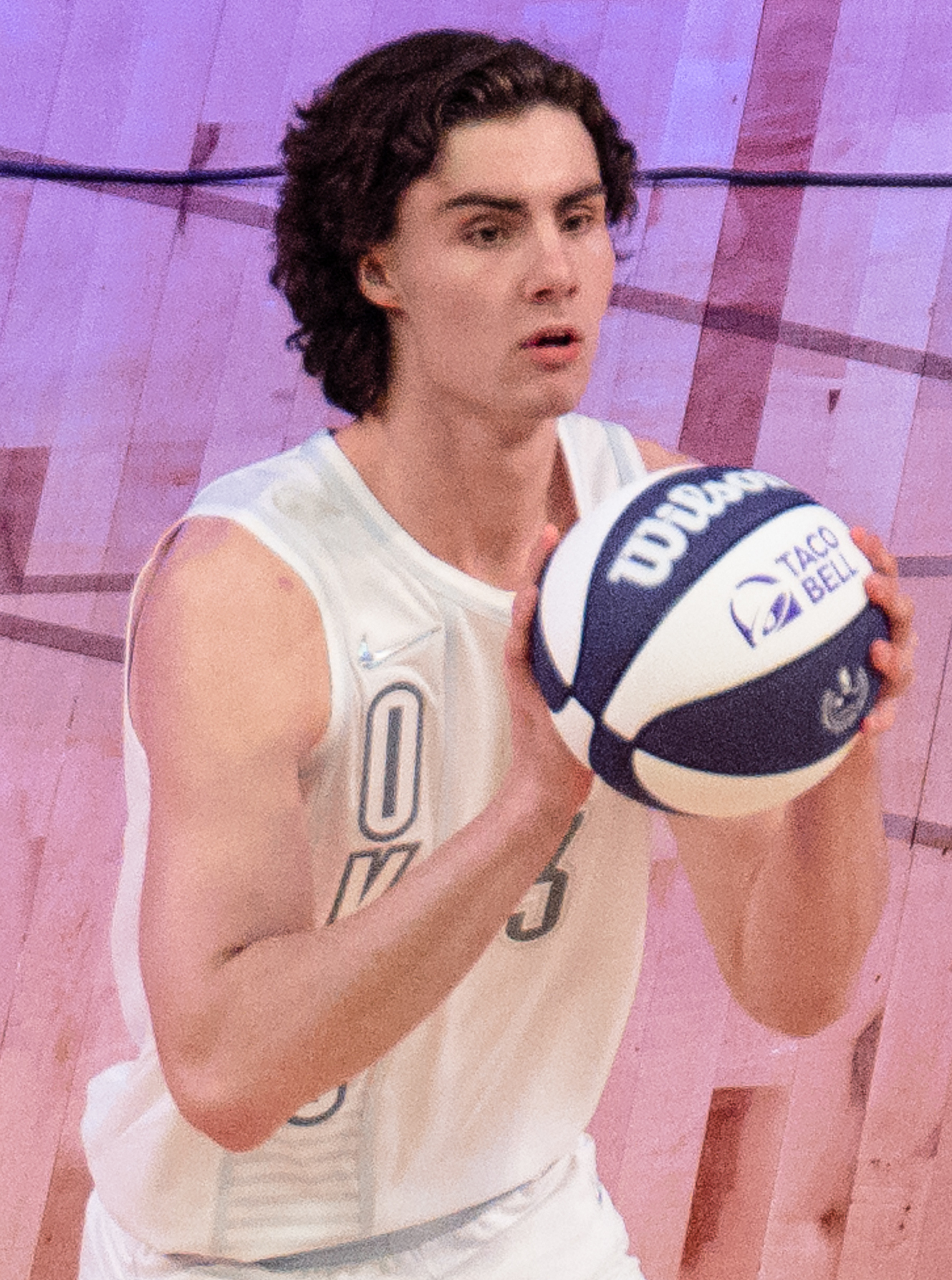
Josh Giddey was selected 6th overall by the Oklahoma City Thunder.

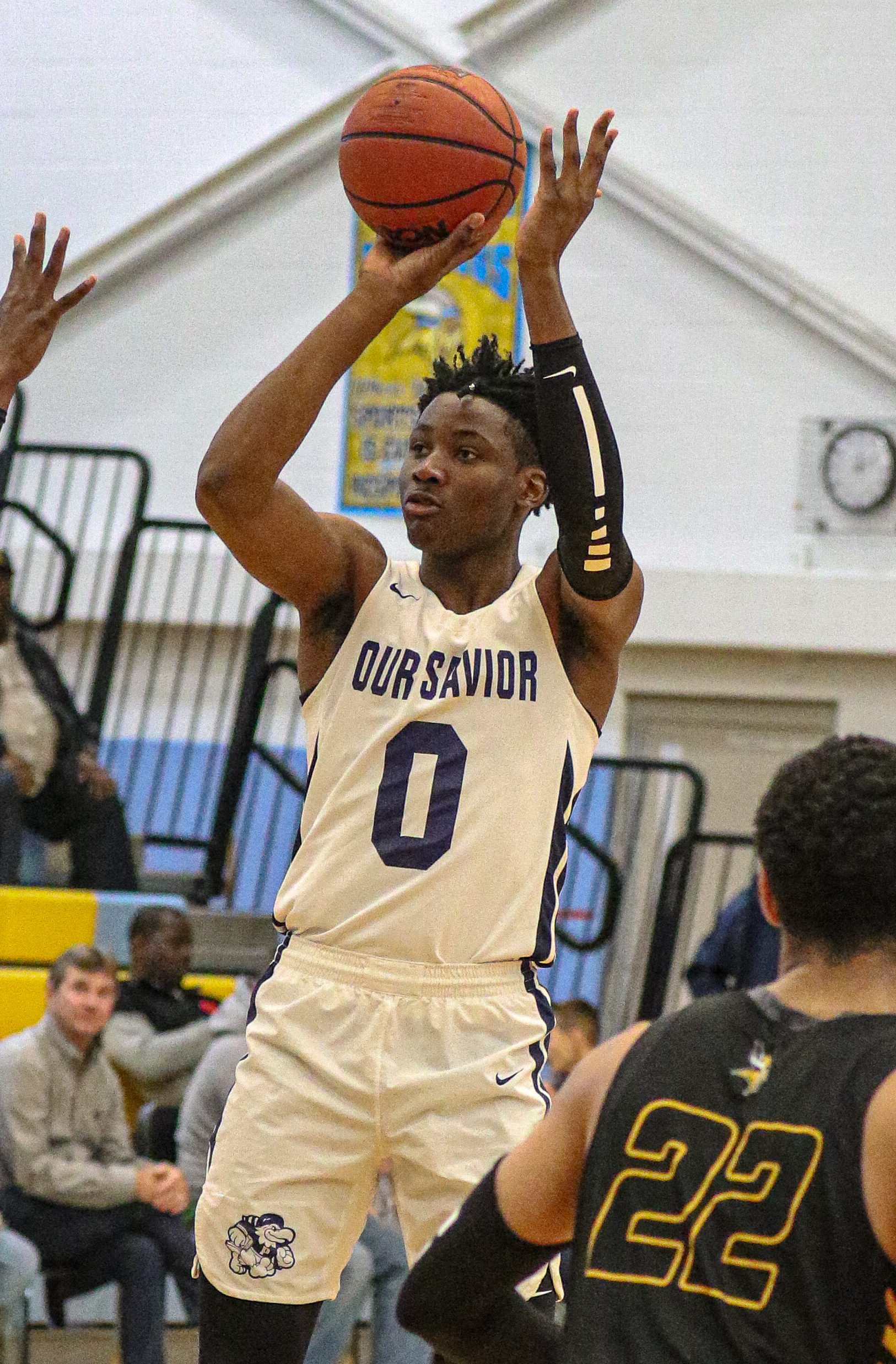
Jonathan Kuminga was selected 7th overall by the Golden State Warriors.

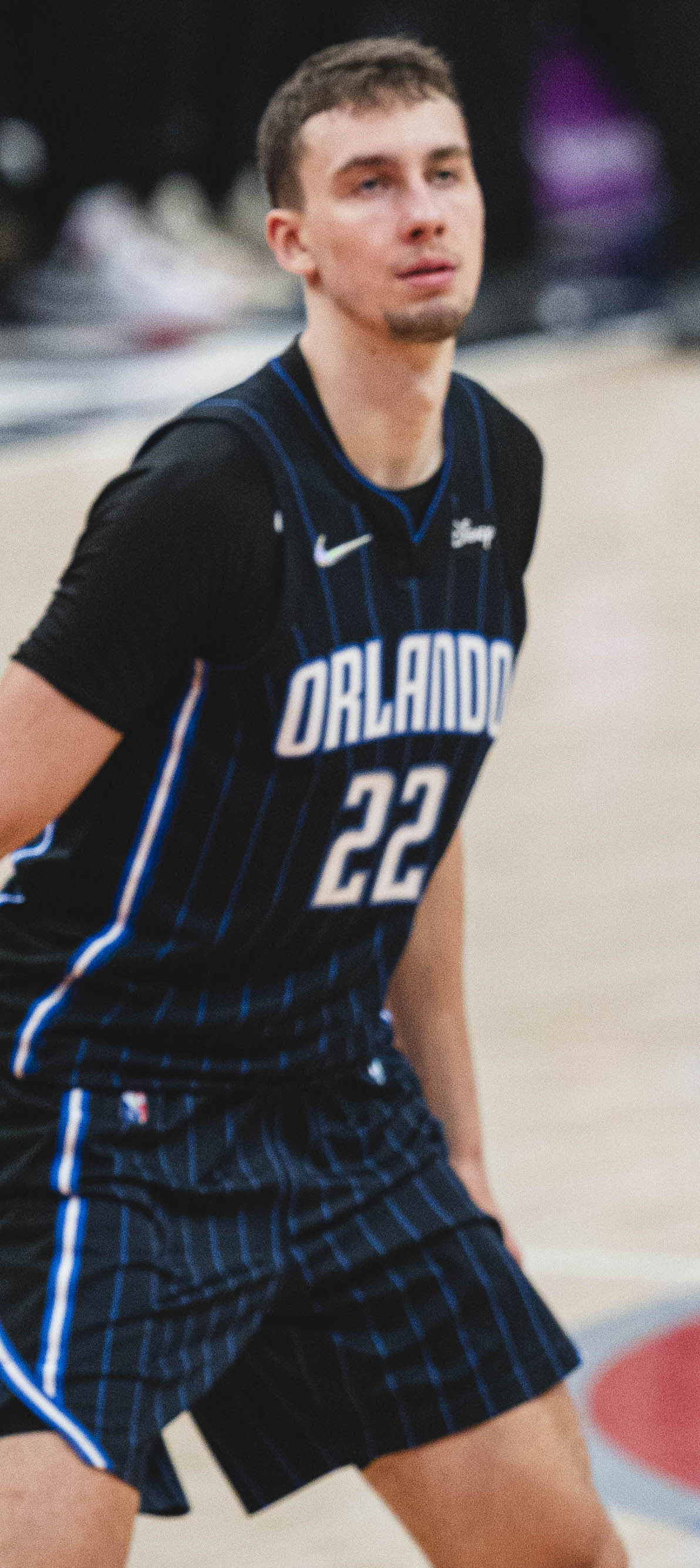
Franz Wagner was selected 8th overall by the Orlando Magic.

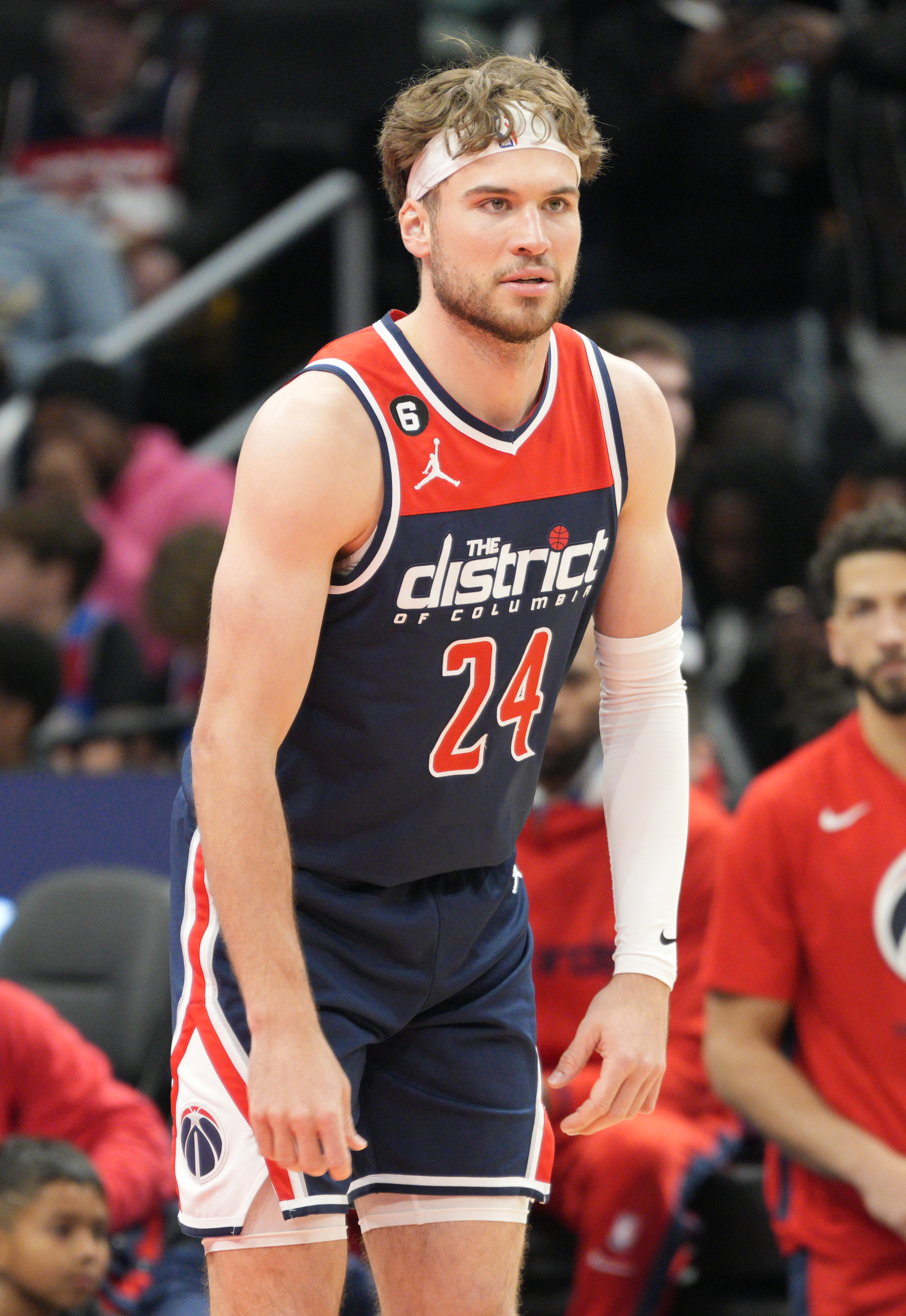
Corey Kispert was selected 15th overall by the Washington Wizards.

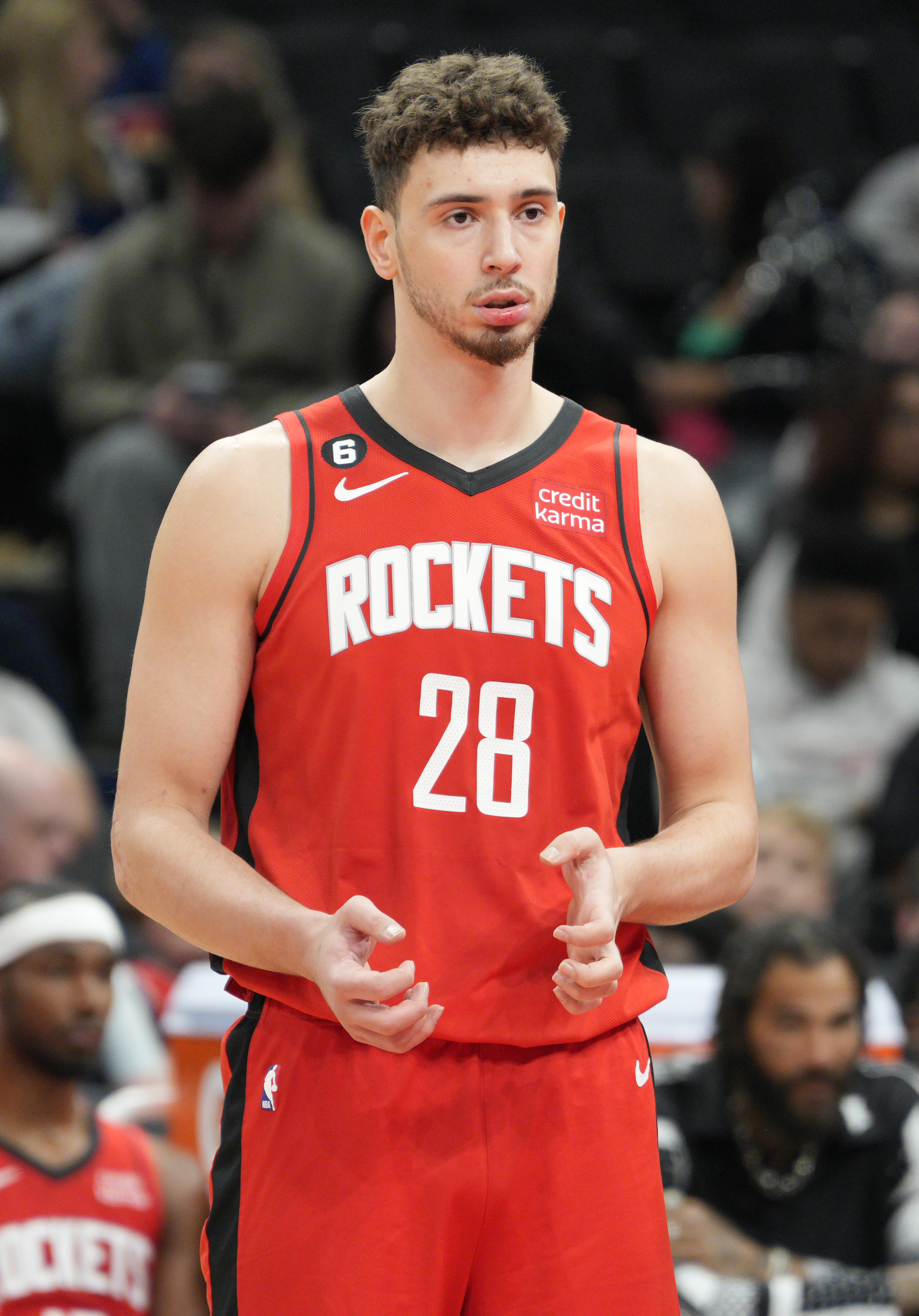
Alperen Şengün was selected 16th overall by the Oklahoma City Thunder (traded to the Houston Rockets).

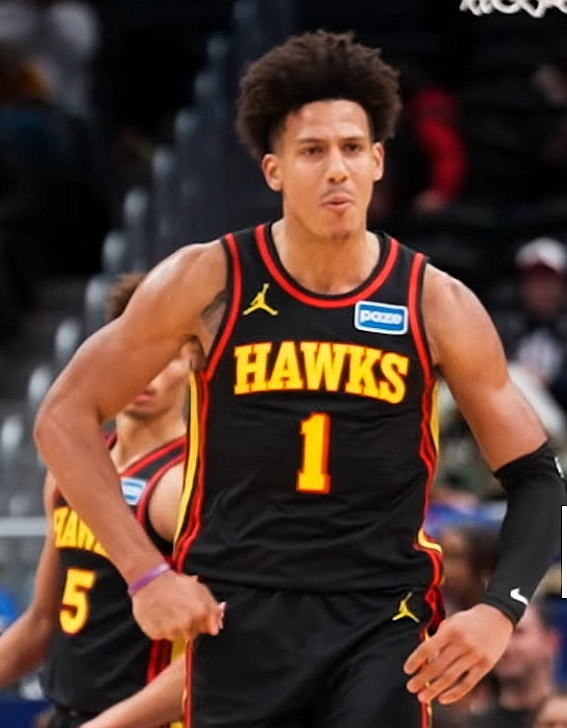
Jalen Johnson was selected 20th overall by the Atlanta Hawks.

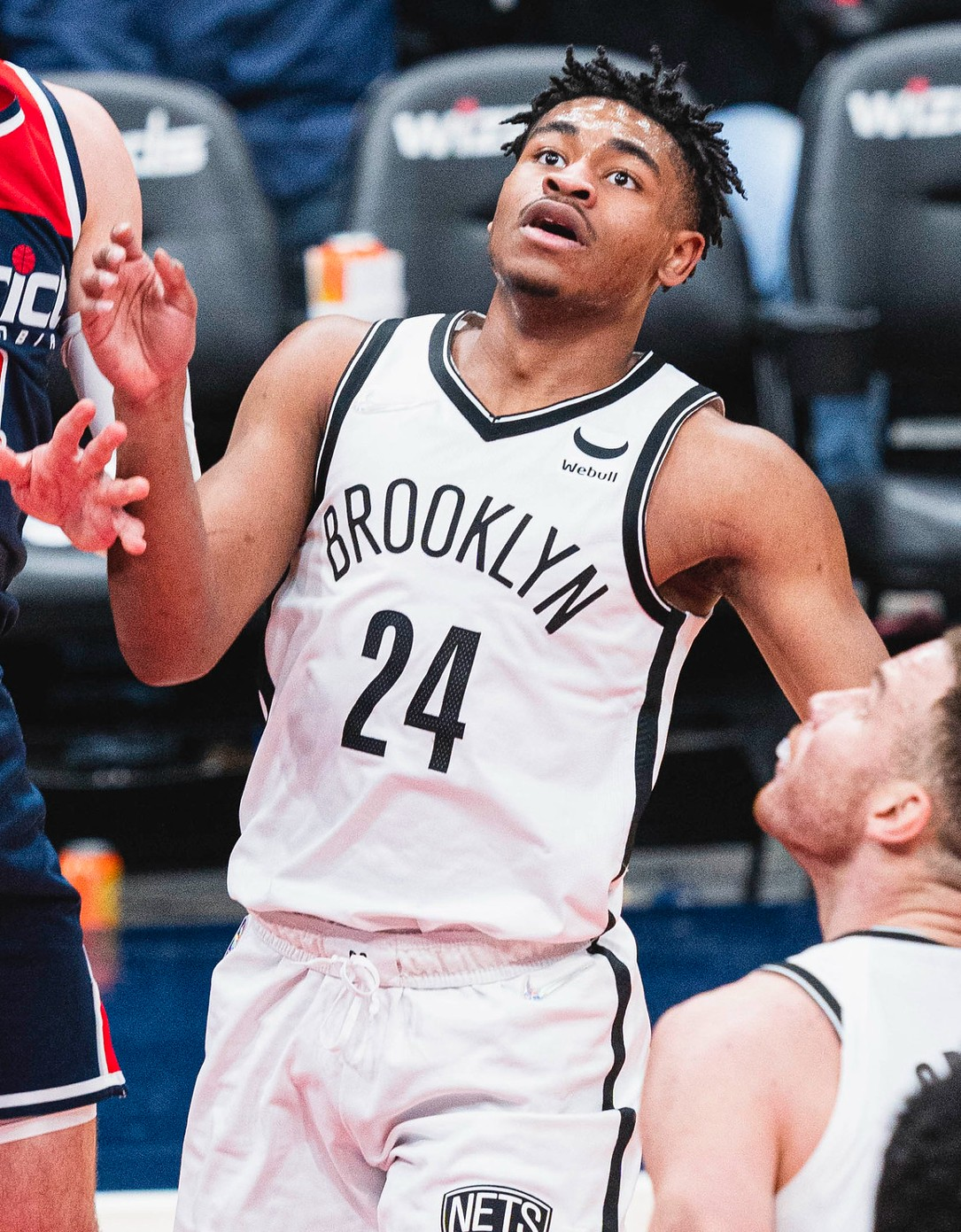
Cam Thomas was selected 27th overall by the Brooklyn Nets.

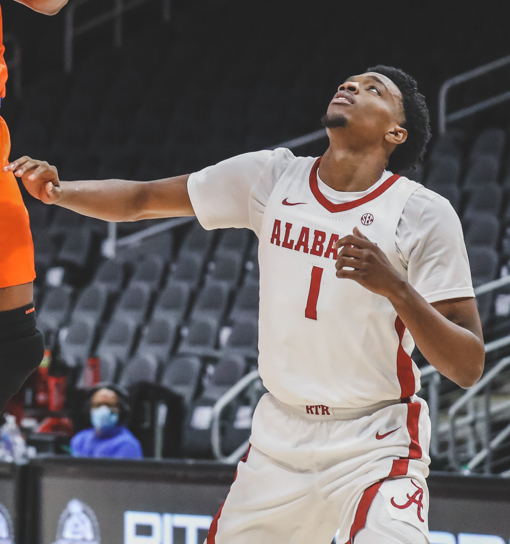
Herbert Jones was selected 35th overall by the New Orleans Pelicans.

PG	Point guard	SG	Shooting guard	SF	Small forward	PF	Power forward	C	Center

*	Denotes player who has been selected for at least one All-Star Game and All-NBA Team
^{+}	Denotes player who has been selected for at least one All-Star Game
^{x}	Denotes player who has been selected for at least one All-NBA Team
^{#}	Denotes player who has never appeared in an NBA regular-season or playoff game
^{~}	Denotes player who has been selected as Rookie of the Year

Rnd.	Pick	Player	Pos.	Nationality (Note: Nationality indicates the player's national team or representative nationality. If a player has not competed at the international level, then the nationality indicates the national team which the player is eligible to represent according to FIBA rules.)	Team	School / club team
1	1	Cade Cunningham^{*}	PG	United States	Detroit Pistons	Oklahoma State (Fr.)
1	2	Jalen Green	SG	United States	Houston Rockets	NBA G League Ignite (NBA G League)
1	3	Evan Mobley^{*}	PF/C	United States	Cleveland Cavaliers	USC (Fr.)
1	4	Scottie Barnes^{+~}	SF/PF	United States	Toronto Raptors	Florida State (Fr.)
1	5	Jalen Suggs	PG	United States	Orlando Magic	Gonzaga (Fr.)
1	6	Josh Giddey	PG/SG	Australia	Oklahoma City Thunder	Adelaide 36ers (Australia)
1	7	Jonathan Kuminga	PF/SF	DR Congo	Golden State Warriors (from Minnesota) (Note: February 6, 2020: Minnesota Timberwolves to Golden State Warriors: Golden State acquired Andrew Wiggins, a top-3 protected 2021 first-round pick, and a second-round draft pick; Minnesota acquired D'Angelo Russell, Jacob Evans, and Omari Spellman)	NBA G League Ignite (NBA G League)
1	8	Franz Wagner	SF	Germany	Orlando Magic (from Chicago) (Note: March 25, 2021: Chicago Bulls to Orlando Magic: Orlando acquired Wendell Carter Jr., Otto Porter Jr., 2021 and 2023 first-round picks; Chicago acquired Nikola Vučević, and Al-Farouq Aminu)	Michigan (So.)
1	9	Davion Mitchell	PG	United States	Sacramento Kings	Baylor (Jr.)
1	10	Ziaire Williams	SF/PF	United States	New Orleans Pelicans (rights traded to Memphis) (Note: August 7, 2021: New Orleans Pelicans to Memphis Grizzlies (three-team trade with Charlotte): Memphis acquired Steven Adams, Eric Bledsoe, a protected 2022 first round draft pick, the draft rights to Ziaire Williams, and the draft rights to Jared Butler; New Orleans acquired Jonas Valančiūnas, Devonte' Graham, the draft rights to Trey Murphy III and the draft rights to Brandon Boston; Charlotte acquired Wesley Iwundu, the draft rights to Tyler Harvey, and a protected 2022 first round pick)	Stanford (Fr.)
1	11	James Bouknight	SG	United States	Charlotte Hornets	UConn (So.)
1	12	Joshua Primo	SG	Canada	San Antonio Spurs	Alabama (Fr.)
1	13	Chris Duarte	SG	Dominican Republic (Note: Duarte was born in the Dominican Republic to a Canadian father. He holds dual citizenship but has played for the Dominican Republic national basketball team.)	Indiana Pacers	Oregon (Sr.)
1	14	Moses Moody	SG	United States	Golden State Warriors	Arkansas (Fr.)
1	15	Corey Kispert	SF	United States	Washington Wizards	Gonzaga (Sr.)
1	16	Alperen Şengün^{+}	C	Turkey	Oklahoma City Thunder (from Boston, (Note: June 18, 2021: Boston Celtics to Oklahoma City Thunder: Oklahoma City acquired Kemba Walker, a 2021 first-round pick, and 2025 second-round picks; Boston acquired Al Horford, Moses Brown, and a 2023 second-round pick) rights traded to Houston) (Note: July 29, 2021: Oklahoma City Thunder to Houston Rockets: Houston acquired the draft rights to Alperen Şengün; Oklahoma City acquired two future first-round picks)	Beşiktaş (Turkey)
1	17	Trey Murphy III	SF	United States	Memphis Grizzlies (rights traded to New Orleans)	Virginia (Jr.)
1	18	Tre Mann	PG	United States	Oklahoma City Thunder (from Miami via Phoenix to Philadelphia to L.A. Clippers) (Note: February 19, 2015: Miami Heat to Phoenix Suns (three-team trade with New Orleans Pelicans): Phoenix acquired Danny Granger, John Salmons, a 2021 first-round pick, and a 2017 protected first-round pick; Miami acquired Goran Dragić and Zoran Dragić; New Orleans acquired Norris Cole, Justin Hamilton and Shawne Williams; June 21, 2018: Phoenix Suns to Philadelphia 76ers: Philadelphia acquired Zhaire Smith and Miami's 2021 first-round pick; Phoenix acquired Mikal Bridges) (Note: February 6, 2019: Philadelphia 76ers to Los Angeles Clippers: L.A. Clippers acquired Landry Shamet, Wilson Chandler, Mike Muscala, Miami's 2021 first-round pick, a protected 2020 first-round pick, 2021 and 2023 second-round picks; Philadelphia acquired Tobias Harris, Boban Marjanović and Mike Scott) (Note: July 10, 2019: Los Angeles Clippers to Oklahoma City Thunder: Oklahoma City acquired Danilo Gallinari, Shai Gilgeous-Alexander, Miami's 2021 first-round pick, a 2022 first-round pick, Miami's 2023 first-round pick, a 2024 first round pick, a 2026 first round pick, and Thunder options to swap 2023 and 2025 first round picks with Clippers; L.A. Clippers acquired Paul George)	Florida (So.)
1	19	Kai Jones	C	Bahamas	New York Knicks (rights traded to Charlotte) (Note: July 29, 2021: New York Knicks to Charlotte Hornets: Charlotte acquired the draft rights to Kai Jones; New York acquired a future first-round pick)	Texas (So.)
1	20	Jalen Johnson^{*}	SF	United States	Atlanta Hawks	Duke (Fr.)
1	21	Keon Johnson	SG	United States	New York Knicks (from Dallas, (Note: January 31, 2019: Dallas Mavericks to New York Knicks: New York acquired Dennis Smith Jr., DeAndre Jordan, Wesley Matthews, 2021 and 2023 first-round picks; Dallas acquired Kristaps Porziņģis, Tim Hardaway Jr., Courtney Lee, and Trey Burke) rights traded to L.A. Clippers) (Note: July 29, 2021: New York Knicks to L.A. Clippers: L.A. Clippers acquired the draft rights to Keon Johnson; New York acquired the draft rights to Quentin Grimes and a future second-round pick)	Tennessee (Fr.)
1	22	Isaiah Jackson	C/PF	United States	Los Angeles Lakers (rights traded to Indiana) (Note: August 6, 2021: Los Angeles Lakers to Indiana Pacers (five-team trade with Washington, San Antonio, and Brooklyn): L.A. Lakers acquired Russell Westbrook and 2023, 2024, and 2028 second-round picks; Indiana acquired the draft rights to Isaiah Jackson; Washington acquired Spencer Dinwiddie, Aaron Holiday, Kentavious Caldwell-Pope, Kyle Kuzma, Montrezl Harrell, the draft rights to forward Isaiah Todd, and cash considerations from Indiana; San Antonio acquired a 2022 second round draft pick and Chandler Hutchison; Brooklyn acquired the draft rights to Nikola Milutinov, a 2024 second round pick, and the option to swap a 2025 second round pick with Washington)	Kentucky (Fr.)
1	23	Usman Garuba	PF/C	Spain	Houston Rockets (from Portland) (Note: November 22, 2020: Portland Trail Blazers to Houston Rockets: Houston acquired Trevor Ariza, the draft rights to Isaiah Stewart and a protected 2021 first-round pick; Portland acquired Robert Covington)	Real Madrid (Spain)
1	24	Josh Christopher	SG	United States	Houston Rockets (from Milwaukee) (Note: March 19, 2021: Milwaukee Bucks to Houston Rockets: Houston acquired D. J. Augustin, D. J. Wilson, a 2023 first-round pick, and option to swap a 2021 second-round pick with Milwaukee's 2021 first-round pick; Milwaukee acquired P. J. Tucker, Rodions Kurucs, and a 2022 first-round pick)	Arizona State (Fr.)
1	25	Quentin Grimes	SG	United States	Los Angeles Clippers (rights traded to New York)	Houston (Jr.)
1	26	Bones Hyland	SG/PG	United States	Denver Nuggets	VCU (So.)
1	27	Cam Thomas	SG	United States	Brooklyn Nets	LSU (Fr.)
1	28	Jaden Springer	SG	United States	Philadelphia 76ers	Tennessee (Fr.)
1	29	Day'Ron Sharpe	C	United States	Phoenix Suns (rights traded to Brooklyn) (Note: August 6, 2021: Phoenix Suns to Brooklyn Nets: Brooklyn acquired the draft rights to Day'Ron Sharpe and Jevon Carter; Phoenix acquired Landry Shamet)	North Carolina (Fr.)
1	30	Santi Aldama	PF/C	Spain	Utah Jazz (rights traded to Memphis) (Note: August 7, 2021: Utah Jazz to Memphis Grizzlies: Memphis acquired the draft rights to Santi Aldama; Utah acquired the draft rights to Jared Butler and two future second round selections)	Loyola (MD) (So.)
2	31	Isaiah Todd	PF	United States	Milwaukee Bucks (from Houston, rights traded to Washington via Indiana) (Note: July 29, 2021: Milwaukee Bucks to Indiana Pacers: Milwaukee acquired the draft rights to Sandro Mamukelashvili and Georgios Kalaitzakis, and two future second round draft picks; Indiana acquired the draft rights to Isaiah Todd)	NBA G League Ignite (NBA G League)
2	32	Jeremiah Robinson-Earl	PF/C	United States	New York Knicks (from Detroit via Philadelphia to L.A. Clippers (Note: June 21, 2018: Detroit Pistons to Philadelphia 76ers: Philadelphia acquired 2021 and 2023 second-round picks; Detroit acquired the draft rights to Khyri Thomas) (Note: February 20, 2020: Los Angeles Clippers to New York Knicks (three-team trade with Washington Wizards): New York acquired Maurice Harkless, the draft rights to Issuf Sanon, a 2020 first-round draft pick, a 2021 second-round pick; L.A. Clippers acquired Marcus Morris and Isaiah Thomas; Washington acquired Jerome Robinson) rights traded to Oklahoma City) (Note: July 29, 2021: New York Knicks to Oklahoma City Thunder: Oklahoma City acquired the draft rights to Jeremiah Robinson-Earl; New York acquired the draft rights to Rokas Jokubaitis and Miles McBride)	Villanova (So.)
2	33	Jason Preston	PG	United States	Orlando Magic (rights traded to L.A. Clippers) (Note: July 29, 2021: Orlando Magic to Los Angeles Clippers: L.A. Clippers acquired the draft rights to Jason Preston; Orlando acquired Detroit's 2026 second-round pick and cash considerations)	Ohio (Jr.)
2	34	Rokas Jokubaitis#	PG	Lithuania	Oklahoma City Thunder (rights traded to New York)	Žalgiris Kaunas (Lithuania)
2	35	Herbert Jones	SF	United States	New Orleans Pelicans (from Cleveland via Atlanta) (Note: January 7, 2017: Cleveland Cavaliers to Atlanta Hawks: Atlanta acquired Mike Dunleavy Jr., Mo Williams, a 2021 second-round pick, a 2022 second-round pick, and cash considerations; Cleveland acquired Kyle Korver; July 6, 2019: Atlanta Hawks to New Orleans Pelicans: New Orleans Pelicans acquired the draft rights to Jaxson Hayes, Nickeil Alexander-Walker and Marcos Louzada Silva, 2021 and 2022 second-round picks; Atlanta acquired Solomon Hill, the draft rights to De'Andre Hunter and Jordan Bone, and a 2023 second round pick)	Alabama (Sr.)
2	36	Miles McBride	PG	United States	Oklahoma City Thunder (from Minnesota via Golden State, (Note: November 11, 2020: Golden State Warriors to Oklahoma City Thunder: Oklahoma City acquired two 2021 second-round picks; Golden State acquired Kelly Oubre Jr.) rights traded to New York)	West Virginia (So.)
2	37	JT Thor	PF	United States	Detroit Pistons (from Toronto via Brooklyn, (Note: February 7, 2019: Toronto Raptors to Brooklyn Nets: Brooklyn acquired Greg Monroe and a 2021 second-round pick; Toronto acquired cash considerations; November 19, 2020: Brooklyn Nets to Detroit Pistons (three-team trade with Los Angeles Clippers): Detroit acquired Saddiq Bey, Džanan Musa, the draft rights to Jaylen Hands, Rodney McGruder, a 2021 second-round pick, and cash considerations; Brooklyn acquired Landry Shamet, Bruce Brown, and the draft rights to Reggie Perry; L.A. Clippers acquired the draft rights to Jay Scrubb; Luke Kennard; Justin Patton; and 2023, 2024, 2025, and 2026 second-round picks) traded to Charlotte) (Note: August 6, 2021: Detroit Pistons to Charlotte Hornets: Charlotte acquired the draft rights to JT Thor and Mason Plumlee; Detroit acquired the draft rights to Balša Koprivica)	Auburn (Fr.)
2	38	Ayo Dosunmu	PG/SG	United States	Chicago Bulls (from New Orleans) (Note: February 1, 2018: New Orleans Pelicans to Chicago Bulls: Chicago acquired Ömer Aşık, Tony Allen, Jameer Nelson, a 2018 first-round pick, and the option to swap a 2021 second-round pick with New Orleans; New Orleans Pelicans acquired Nikola Mirotić and a 2018 second-round pick)	Illinois (Jr.)
2	39	Neemias Queta	C	Portugal	Sacramento Kings	Utah State (Jr.)
2	40	Jared Butler	SG	United States	New Orleans Pelicans (from Chicago, rights traded to Utah via Memphis)	Baylor (Jr.)
2	41	Joe Wieskamp	SF	United States	San Antonio Spurs	Iowa (Jr.)
2	42	Isaiah Livers	SF	United States	Detroit Pistons (from Charlotte via New York) (Note: February 7, 2018: Charlotte Hornets to New York Knicks: New York acquired Johnny O'Bryant III, a 2020 second-round pick, and a 2021 second-round pick; Charlotte acquired Willy Hernangómez; February 8, 2021: New York Knicks to Detroit Pistons.: Detroit acquired Dennis Smith Jr. and a 2021 second-round pick; New York acquired Derrick Rose)	Michigan (Sr.)
2	43	Greg Brown	PF	United States	New Orleans Pelicans (from Washington via Utah to Cleveland to Milwaukee, (Note: July 7, 2016: Washington Wizards to Utah Jazz: Utah acquired a 2021 second-round pick; Washington acquired Trey Burke; November 29, 2018: Utah Jazz to Cleveland Cavaliers: Cleveland acquired Alec Burks, a 2020 second-round pick, and a 2021 second-round pick; Utah acquired Kyle Korver) (Note: December 7, 2018: Cleveland Cavaliers to Milwaukee Bucks (three-team trade with the Washington Wizards): Cleveland acquired Matthew Dellavedova, John Henson, 2021 and 2022 second-round picks, and a conditional 2022 first-round pick; Milwaukee acquired George Hill, Jason Smith, a 2020 second-round pick, Washington's 2021 second-round pick, and cash considerations; Washington acquired Sam Dekker and a conditional 2020 second-round pick) (Note: February 7, 2019: Milwaukee Bucks to New Orleans Pelicans (three-team trade with the Detroit Pistons): New Orleans acquired Jason Smith, Stanley Johnson, a 2019 second-round pick, two 2020 second-round picks, and a 2021 second-round pick; Milwaukee acquired Nikola Mirotić; Detroit acquired Thon Maker) rights traded to Portland) (Note: July 29, 2021: New Orleans Pelicans to Portland Trail Blazers: Portland acquired the draft rights to Greg Brown III; New Orleans acquired a future second-round pick and cash considerations)	Texas (Fr.)
2	44	Kessler Edwards	SF	United States	Brooklyn Nets (from Indiana) (Note: July 7, 2016: Indiana Pacers to Brooklyn Nets: Brooklyn acquired the draft rights to Caris LeVert and a 2021 second-round pick; Indiana acquired Thaddeus Young)	Pepperdine (Jr.)
2	45	Juhann Begarin#	SG	France	Boston Celtics	Paris Basketball (France)
2	46	Dalano Banton	PG	Canada	Toronto Raptors (from Memphis via Sacramento) (Note: July 17, 2018: Memphis Grizzlies to Sacramento Kings: Sacramento acquired Ben McLemore, Deyonta Davis, a 2021 second-round pick, and cash considerations; Memphis acquired Garrett Temple; March 25, 2021: Sacramento Kings to Toronto Raptors: Toronto acquired a 2021 second-round pick; Sacramento acquired Terence Davis)	Nebraska (So.)
2	47	David Johnson	SG	United States	Toronto Raptors (from Golden State via New Orleans to Utah) (Note: June 20, 2019: Golden State Warriors to New Orleans Pelicans: New Orleans acquired 2021 and 2023 second-round picks; Golden State acquired the draft rights to Alen Smailagić; July 7, 2019: New Orleans Pelicans to Utah Jazz: Utah acquired 2021 and 2023 second-round picks; New Orleans acquired Derrick Favors; March 25, 2021: Utah Jazz to Toronto Raptors: Toronto acquired a 2021 second-round pick; Utah acquired Matt Thomas)	Louisville (So.)
2	48	Sharife Cooper	PG	United States	Atlanta Hawks (from Miami via Portland to Sacramento) (Note: February 18, 2016: Miami Heat to Portland Trail Blazers: Portland acquired Brian Roberts and a 2021 second-round pick; Miami acquired cash considerations; June 21, 2018: Portland Trail Blazers to Sacramento Kings: Sacramento acquired a 2019 second-round pick and a 2021 second-round pick; Portland acquired the draft rights to Gary Trent Jr.; February 6, 2020: Sacramento Kings to Atlanta Hawks: Atlanta acquired Dewayne Dedmon, a 2020 second-round pick, and a 2021 second-round pick; Sacramento acquired Jabari Parker and Alex Len)	Auburn (Fr.)
2	49	Marcus Zegarowski#	PG	United States	Brooklyn Nets (from Atlanta) (Note: July 6, 2019: Atlanta Hawks to Brooklyn Nets: Brooklyn acquired Taurean Prince and a 2021 second-round pick; Atlanta acquired the draft rights to Nickeil Alexander-Walker, Allen Crabbe, and a protected 2020 first-round pick)	Creighton (Jr.)
2	50	Filip Petrušev	C	Serbia	Philadelphia 76ers (from New York) (Note: June 26, 2015: New York Knicks to Philadelphia 76ers: Philadelphia acquired a 2020 second-round pick, a 2021 second-round pick, and cash considerations; New York acquired the draft rights to Willy Hernangómez)	Mega Basket (Serbia)
2	51	Brandon Boston Jr.	SG	United States	Memphis Grizzlies (from Portland via Cleveland to Detroit to Dallas, (Note: February 4, 2019: Portland Trail Blazers to Cleveland Cavaliers: Cleveland acquired Nik Stauskas, Wade Baldwin IV, 2021 and 2023 second-round picks; Portland acquired Rodney Hood; June 26, 2019: Cleveland Cavaliers to Detroit Pistons: Detroit acquired a 2020 second-round pick, a 2021 second-round pick, a 2023 second-round pick, a conditional 2024 second-round pick, and cash considerations; Cleveland acquired the draft rights to Kevin Porter Jr.; June 26, 2019: Detroit Pistons to Dallas Mavericks: Dallas acquired the draft rights to Isaiah Roby, a 2020 second-round pick, and a 2021 second-round pick; Detroit acquired the draft rights to Deividas Sirvydis; July 8, 2019: Dallas Mavericks to Memphis Grizzlies: Memphis acquired the draft rights to Satnam Singh, a 2021 second-round pick, and a Least Favorable 2023 second-round pick; Dallas acquired Delon Wright) traded to L.A. Clippers via New Orleans) (Note: August 7, 2021: New Orleans Pelicans to Los Angeles Clippers: L.A. Clippers acquired the draft rights to Brandon Boston Jr.; New Orleans acquired a 2022 second round selection and cash considerations)	Kentucky (Fr.)
2	52	Luka Garza	C	United States	Detroit Pistons (from L.A. Lakers via Detroit to Houston to Sacramento) (Note: February 6, 2019: Los Angeles Lakers to Detroit Pistons: Detroit acquired Sviatoslav Mykhailiuk, and a 2021 second-round pick; L.A. Lakers acquired Reggie Bullock; November 24, 2020: Detroit Pistons to Houston Rockets: Houston acquired Christian Wood, a conditional first-round pick, and a 2021 second-round pick; Detroit acquired Trevor Ariza, the draft rights to Isaiah Stewart, a 2027 second-round pick, and cash considerations; November 25, 2020: Houston Rockets to Sacramento Kings: Sacramento acquired a 2021 second-round pick and cash considerations; Houston acquired the draft rights to Kenyon Martin Jr.; March 25, 2021: Sacramento Kings to Detroit Pistons: Detroit acquired Cory Joseph, 2021and 2024 second-round picks; Sacramento acquired Delon Wright)	Iowa (Sr.)
2	53	Charles Bassey	C	Nigeria	Philadelphia 76ers (from Dallas via New Orleans) (Note: March 25, 2021: Dallas Mavericks to New Orleans Pelicans: New Orleans acquired James Johnson, Wesley Iwundu, and a 2021 second-round pick; Dallas acquired JJ Redick and Nicolò Melli; July 29, 2021: New Orleans Pelicans to Philadelphia 76ers: Philadelphia acquired No. 53 pick; New Orleans acquired cash considerations)	Western Kentucky (Jr.)
2	54	Sandro Mamukelashvili	PF/C	Georgia (Note: Mamukelashvili was born in the United States to Georgian parents and raised in Georgia. He holds dual citizenship but plays for the Georgia national basketball team.)	Indiana Pacers (from Milwaukee via Cleveland to Houston, (Note: February 7, 2019: Cleveland Cavaliers to Houston Rockets (three-team trade with the Sacramento Kings: Houston acquired Wade Baldwin IV, Iman Shumpert, Nik Stauskas, a 2020 second-round pick swap (with Cleveland), and a 2021 second-round pick; Cleveland acquired Marquese Chriss, Brandon Knight, a condition 2019 first-round pick, and a 2022 second-round pick; Sacramento acquired Alec Burks; February 7, 2019: Houston Rockets to Indiana Pacers: Pacers acquired Wade Baldwin IV, Nik Stauskas, the draft rights to Maarty Leunen, and a 2021 second-round pick; Houston acquired cash considerations) rights traded to Milwaukee)	Seton Hall (Sr.)
2	55	Aaron Wiggins	SG	United States	Oklahoma City Thunder (from Denver via Philadelphia to Golden State) (Note: July 6, 2018: Denver Nuggets to Philadelphia 76ers: Philadelphia acquired Wilson Chandler and a 2021 second round pick; Denver acquired cash considerations; February 6, 2020: Philadelphia 76ers to Golden State Warriors: Golden State acquired 2020, 2021, and 2022 second-round picks; Philadelphia acquired Alec Burks and Glenn Robinson III)	Maryland (Jr.)
2	56	Scottie Lewis	SG	United States	Charlotte Hornets (from L.A. Clippers) (Note: June 21, 2018: Los Angeles Clippers to Charlotte Hornets: Charlotte acquired the draft rights to Miles Bridges, a 2020 second-round pick, and a 2021 second-round pick; Los Angeles acquired the draft rights to Shai Gilgeous-Alexander)	Florida (So.)
2	57	Balša Koprivica#	C	Serbia	Charlotte Hornets (from Brooklyn, (Note: July 6, 2018: Brooklyn Nets to Charlotte Hornets: Charlotte acquired Timofey Mozgov, the draft rights to Hamidou Diallo, and a 2021 second-round pick; Brooklyn acquired Dwight Howard) rights traded to Detroit)	Florida State (So.)
2	58	Jericho Sims	PF/C	United States	New York Knicks (from Philadelphia) (Note: March 25, 2021: Philadelphia 76ers to New York Knicks (three-team trade with Oklahoma City Thunder): New York acquired Terrance Ferguson, Vincent Poirier, Emir Preldžič, a 2021 second-round pick, and Miami's protected 2024 second-round pick; Philadelphia acquired George Hill, Ignas Brazdeikis; Oklahoma City acquired Austin Rivers, Tony Bradley, and Philadelphia's 2025 and 2026 second-round picks)	Texas (Sr.)
2	59	RaiQuan Gray	PF	United States	Brooklyn Nets (from Phoenix) (Note: July 20, 2018: Phoenix Suns to Brooklyn Nets: Brooklyn acquired Jared Dudley and a 2021 second-round pick; Phoenix acquired Darrell Arthur)	Florida State (Jr.)
2	60	Georgios Kalaitzakis	SG/SF	Greece	Indiana Pacers (from Utah, (Note: June 21, 2019: Utah Jazz to Indiana Pacers: Indiana acquired a 2021 second-round pick; Utah acquired the draft rights to Jarrell Brantley) rights traded to Milwaukee)	Panathinaikos (Greece)

== Notable undrafted players ==
These players were not selected in the 2021 NBA draft, but have played at least one game in the NBA.

Player	Pos.	Nationality	School/club team
Jose Alvarado	PG	Puerto Rico	Georgia Tech (Sr.)
Alex Antetokounmpo	PF	Greece	UCAM Murcia (Spain)
Joël Ayayi	SG	France	Gonzaga (Jr.)
Onuralp Bitim	SF	Turkey	Frutti Extra Bursaspor (Turkey)
Chaundee Brown Jr.	SG	United States	Michigan (Sr.)
D. J. Carton	PG	United States	Marquette (So.)
Justin Champagnie	SF	United States	Pittsburgh (So.)
Jalen Crutcher	PG	United States	Dayton (Sr.)
David Duke Jr.	SG	United States	Providence (Jr.)
Aleem Ford	SF	United States	Wisconsin (Sr.)
Marcus Garrett	PG	United States	Kansas (Sr.)
Jordan Goodwin	SG	United States	Saint Louis (Sr.)
Sam Hauser	PF	United States	Virginia (Sr.)
Aaron Henry	SF	United States	Michigan State (Jr.)
Jay Huff	C	United States	Virginia (Sr.)
Feron Hunt	SF	United States	SMU (Jr.)
Matthew Hurt	PF	United States	Duke (So.)
DeJon Jarreau	PG/SG	United States	Houston (Sr.)
Carlik Jones	PG	United States (Note: Jones was born and raised in the United States. He gained South Sudanese citizenship by naturalization and plays for the South Sudan national basketball team.)	Louisville (Sr.)
A. J. Lawson	SG	Canada	South Carolina (Jr.)
Mac McClung	PG	United States	Texas Tech (Jr.)
JaQuori McLaughlin	PG	United States	UC Santa Barbara (Sr.)
RJ Nembhard	SG	United States	TCU (Sr.)
Daishen Nix	PG	United States	NBA G League Ignite (NBA G League)
Eugene Omoruyi	SF	Canada	Oregon (Sr.)
Jamorko Pickett	SF	United States	Georgetown (Sr.)
Yves Pons	PF	France (Note: Pons was born in Haiti and raised in France. He plays for the France national basketball team.)	Tennessee (Sr.)
Micah Potter	PF/C	United States	Wisconsin (Sr.)
Austin Reaves	SG	United States	Oklahoma (Sr.)
Alex Reese	PF/C	United States	Alabama (Sr.)
Olivier Sarr	C	France	Kentucky (Sr.)
Jordan Schakel	SG/SF	United States	San Diego State (Sr.)
Javonte Smart	PG	United States	LSU (Jr.)
Dru Smith	SG	United States	Missouri (Sr.)
Terry Taylor	SG/SF	United States	Austin Peay (Sr.)
Ethan Thompson	SG	Puerto Rico	Oregon State (Sr.)
M. J. Walker	SG	United States	Florida State (Sr.)
Keaton Wallace	PG/SG	United States	UTSA (Sr.)
Duane Washington Jr.	PG/SG	United States	Ohio State (Jr.)
Trendon Watford	PF	United States	LSU (So.)
Phillip Wheeler	SF	United States	Ranney School
Brandon Williams	PG	United States	Arizona (So.)
McKinley Wright IV	PG	United States	Colorado (Sr.)
Moses Wright	PF	United States	Georgia Tech (Sr.)

== Trades involving draft picks ==
=== Pre-draft trades ===
Prior to the draft, the following trades were made and resulted in exchanges of draft picks between teams.

=== Draft-night trades ===
Draft-night trades were made after the draft began. These trades are usually not confirmed until the next day or after free agency officially begins.

== Combine ==
Prior to the NBA Draft Combine, the 2021 NBA G League Elite Camp, which took place on June 19–21 at the Wintrust Arena and Marriott Marquis in Chicago, provided another chance for players not originally invited to the combine to impress scouts. The best performers from this camp were given invites to the main combine.

The NBA Draft Combine was held on June 21–27 at the same site sponsored by Microsoft. A total of 69 players attended the NBA Draft Combine 2021, with these players undergoing a series of interviews, five-on-five games, drills, and measurements. Lottery-projected pick Keon Johnson broke the combine's vertical leap record of 45.5 in (1.16 m), set by Kenny Gregory in 2001, with a vertical leap of 48 in (1.2 m). The combine also featured some recent graduates of the inaugural NBA G League Ignite team, which is a developmental basketball program meant to provide prospects with a paid alternative to playing NCAA college basketball. The success of these players, Jalen Green, Jonathan Kuminga, Daishen Nix, and Isaiah Todd, may pave the way for more top prospects to participate in the G League system pre-draft.

Projected top picks who decided not to attend the NBA Draft Combine include potential No. 1 pick Cade Cunningham and likely top-four pick Jalen Suggs. Numerous other potential prospects, especially those playing overseas, also decided to skip the Combine.

== Draft lottery ==
External videos
- 2021 NBA Draft Lottery Drawing, NBA's official YouTube channel. Jun 22, 2021.

The NBA draft lottery was held on June 22. It was also televised nationally on ESPN.

Denotes the actual lottery result

Team	2020–21 record	Lottery chances	Lottery probabilities													
Team	2020–21 record	Lottery chances	1st	2nd	3rd	4th	5th	6th	7th	8th	9th	10th	11th	12th	13th	14th
Houston Rockets	17–55	140	14.0%	13.4%	12.7%	11.9%	47.9%	-	-	-	-	-	-	-	-	-
Detroit Pistons	20–52	140	14.0%	13.4%	12.7%	11.9%	27.8%	20.1%	-	-	-	-	-	-	-	-
Orlando Magic	21–51	140	14.0%	13.4%	12.7%	11.9%	14.8%	26.0%	7.1%	-	-	-	-	-	-	-
Oklahoma City Thunder	22–50	115	11.5%	11.4%	11.2%	11.0%	7.4%	27.1%	18.0%	2.4%	-	-	-	-	-	-
Cleveland Cavaliers	22–50	115	11.5%	11.4%	11.2%	11.0%	2.0%	18.2%	25.5%	8.6%	0.6%	-	-	-	-	-
Minnesota Timberwolves (Note: This pick was conveyed to Golden State after it fell outside its protected range.)	23–49	90	9.0%	9.2%	9.4%	9.6%	-	8.6%	29.7%	20.6%	3.4%	0.2%	-	-	-	-
Toronto Raptors	27–45	75	7.5%	7.8%	8.1%	8.5%	-	-	19.8%	33.9%	13.0%	1.4%	<0.1%	-	-	-
Chicago Bulls (Note: This pick was conveyed to Orlando after it fell outside its protected range.)	31–41	45	4.5%	4.8%	5.2%	5.7%	-	-	-	34.5%	36.2%	8.5%	0.5%	<0.1%	-	-
Sacramento Kings	31–41	45	4.5%	4.8%	5.2%	5.7%	-	-	-	-	46.4%	29.4%	3.9%	0.1%	<0.1%	-
New Orleans Pelicans	31–41	45	4.5%	4.8%	5.2%	5.7%	-	-	-	-	-	60.6%	17.9%	1.2%	<0.1%	<0.1%
Charlotte Hornets	33–39	18	1.8%	2.0%	2.2%	2.5%	-	-	-	-	-	-	77.6%	13.4%	0.4%	<0.1%
San Antonio Spurs	33–39	17	1.7%	1.9%	2.1%	2.4%	-	-	-	-	-	-	-	85.2%	6.6%	0.1%
Indiana Pacers	34–38	10	1.0%	1.1%	1.2%	1.4%	-	-	-	-	-	-	-	-	92.9%	2.3%
Golden State Warriors	39–33	5	0.5%	0.6%	0.6%	0.7%	-	-	-	-	-	-	-	-	-	97.6%

== Eligibility and entrants ==
The draft is conducted under the eligibility rules established in the league's 2017 collective bargaining agreement (CBA) with its players' union, with special modifications agreed to by both parties due to disruptions caused by the COVID-19 pandemic. The previous CBA that ended the 2011 lockout instituted no immediate changes to the draft. but called for a committee of owners and players to discuss further charges.

- All drafted players must be at least 19 years old during the calendar year of the draft. In term of dates, players who were eligible for the 2021 NBA draft must have been born on or before December 31, 2002.
  - This draft could have possibly been the last in which high school players of any nationality are ineligible for pick after graduation as the two associations sought at first to lower the minimum age back to 18 and end the need to wait one year after their high school class graduated, also called the "one and done" requirement, ahead of next year's edition, as discussed in 2019. If approved, the current CBA may have to be amended and the amendment ratified. However, the ineligibility for the draft shortly after high school remained in place, as reported in 2020, unless there were further discussions about its repeal.
- Since the 2016 draft, the following rules are, as implemented by the NCAA Division I council for that division:
  - Declaration for the draft no longer results in automatic loss of college eligibility. As long as a player does not sign a contract with a professional team outside the NBA, or sign with an agent, he retains college eligibility as long as he makes a timely withdrawal from the draft.
  - NCAA players now have 10 days after the end of the NBA Draft Combine to withdraw from the draft. Since the combine is normally held in mid-May, the current deadline is about five weeks after the previous mid-April deadline.
  - NCAA players may participate in the draft combine, and are allowed to attend one tryout per year with each NBA team without losing college eligibility.
  - NCAA players may now enter and withdraw from the draft up to two times without loss of eligibility. Previously, the NCAA treated a second declaration of draft eligibility as a permanent loss of college eligibility.

The NBA announced on February 26, 2021, that for this draft only, all college players who wished to enter the draft, regardless of class, had to formally declare eligibility. In October 2020, COVID-19 led the NCAA to declare that the 2020–21 season would not be counted against the college eligibility of any basketball player. The exact language of the CBA with regard to automatic eligibility of college seniors is "The player has graduated from a four-year college or university in the United States, and has no remaining intercollegiate basketball eligibility." Due to the NCAA ruling, every college senior in the 2020–21 season had remaining eligibility. The league was required to consult with the players' union and the NCAA to determine whether it would require seniors to opt out of the draft (which was implemented by the NFL for its 2021 draft, affected by a similar NCAA ruling for football) or require opt-ins, with the latter option being chosen.

=== Early entrants ===
Players who were not automatically eligible had to declare their eligibility for the draft by notifying the NBA offices in writing no later than at least 60 days before the event. For the 2021 draft, the date fell on May 30. Under the CBA a player may withdraw his name from consideration from the draft at any time before the final declaration deadline, which usually falls 10 days before the draft at 5:00 pm EDT (2100 UTC). Under current NCAA rules, players usually have until 10 days after the draft combine to withdraw from the draft and retain college eligibility. They must have withdrawn on or before July 7, 22 days prior to this draft.

A player who has hired an agent retains his remaining college eligibility regardless of whether he is drafted after an evaluation from the NBA Undergraduate Advisory Committee. Players who declare for the NBA draft and are not selected have the opportunity to return to their school for at least another year only after terminating all agreements with their agents, who must have been certified no later than August 1, 2020.

The NBA released its official list of early entrants on June 2, 2021, consisting of 296 players from college and other educational institutions and 57 international players. The current version of the list found in this article omits players who withdrew from the draft after June 2.

==== College underclassmen ====
Terrence Clarke, a freshman guard from Kentucky, declared for the draft, but died on April 22, three months before it. At the draft, the NBA honored him with an honorary selection.

- (Spain) Santi Aldama – F, Loyola (MD) (sophomore)
- (France) Joël Ayayi – G, Gonzaga (redshirt junior)
- (Canada) Dalano Banton – G, Nebraska (redshirt sophomore)
- (United States) Scottie Barnes – F, Florida State (freshman)
- (Nigeria) Charles Bassey – C, Western Kentucky (junior)
- (Georgia (country)) Giorgi Bezhanishvili – F, Illinois (junior)
- (United States) Brandon Boston Jr. – G, Kentucky (freshman)
- (United States) James Bouknight – G, UConn (sophomore)
- (United States) Pedro Bradshaw – F, Bellarmine (redshirt junior)
- (United States) Greg Brown – F, Texas (freshman)
- (United States) Jared Butler – G, Baylor (junior)
- (United States) D. J. Carton – G, Marquette (sophomore)
- (United States) Justin Champagnie – F, Pittsburgh (sophomore)
- (United States) Josh Christopher – G, Arizona State (freshman)
- (United States) Sharife Cooper – G, Auburn (freshman)
- (United States) Derek Culver – C, West Virginia (junior)
- (United States) Sam Cunliffe – G, Evansville (redshirt junior)
- (United States) Cade Cunningham – G, Oklahoma State (freshman)
- (United States) Ayo Dosunmu – G, Illinois (junior)
- (United States) David Duke Jr. – G, Providence (junior)
- (United States) Nojel Eastern – G, Purdue (junior)
- (United States) Kessler Edwards – F, Pepperdine (junior)
- (United States) RaiQuan Gray – F, Florida State (redshirt junior)
- (United States) Alan Griffin – G, Syracuse (junior)
- (United States) Quentin Grimes – G, Houston (junior)
- (United States) Aaron Henry – F, Michigan State (junior)
- (United States) Feron Hunt – F, SMU (junior)
- (United States) Matthew Hurt – F, Duke (sophomore)
- (United States) Bones Hyland – G, VCU (sophomore)
- (United States) Isaiah Jackson – F, Kentucky (freshman)
- (United States) David Johnson – G, Louisville (sophomore)
- (United States) Jalen Johnson – F, Duke (freshman)
- (United States) Keon Johnson – G, Tennessee (freshman)
- (The Bahamas) Kai Jones – F, Texas (sophomore)
- (Serbia) Balša Koprivica – C, Florida State (sophomore)
- (Canada) A. J. Lawson – G, South Carolina (junior)
- (United States) Scottie Lewis – G, Florida (sophomore)
- (United States) Tre Mann – G, Florida (sophomore)
- (United States) Miles McBride – G, West Virginia (sophomore)
- (United States) Mac McClung – G, Texas Tech (junior)
- (United States) Davion Mitchell – G, Baylor (redshirt junior)
- (United States) Evan Mobley – F/C, USC (freshman)
- (United States) Moses Moody – G, Arkansas (freshman)
- (United States) Trey Murphy III – F, Virginia (junior)
- (United States) RJ Nembhard – G, TCU (redshirt junior)
- (Democratic Republic of the Congo) Joel Ntambwe – F, Texas Tech (redshirt sophomore)
- (United States) Jason Preston – G, Ohio (junior)
- (Canada) Joshua Primo – G, Alabama (freshman)
- (Portugal) Neemias Queta – C, Utah State (junior)
- (United States) Jeremiah Robinson-Earl – F, Villanova (sophomore)
- (United States) Damion Rosser – G, New Orleans (redshirt junior)
- (United States) Day'Ron Sharpe – C, North Carolina (freshman)
- (United States) Javonte Smart – G, LSU (junior)
- (United States) Jaden Springer – G, Tennessee (freshman)
- (United States) DJ Steward – G, Duke (freshman)
- (United States) D. J. Stewart Jr. – G, Mississippi State (redshirt sophomore)
- (United States) Jalen Suggs – G, Gonzaga (freshman)
- (United States) Cam Thomas – G, LSU (freshman)
- (United States) JT Thor – F, Auburn (freshman)
- (Germany) Franz Wagner – F, Michigan (sophomore)
- (United States) Kyree Walker – G, Hillcrest Prep Academy (postgraduate)
- (United States) Duane Washington Jr. – G, Ohio State (junior)
- (United States) Trendon Watford – F, LSU (sophomore)
- (United States) Romeo Weems – F, DePaul (sophomore)
- (United States) Joe Wieskamp – G, Iowa (junior)
- (United States) Aaron Wiggins – G, Maryland (junior)
- (United States) Brandon Williams – G, Arizona (sophomore)
- (United States) Ziaire Williams – F, Stanford (freshman)
- (United States) Bryce Wills – G, Stanford (junior)
- (United States) Marcus Zegarowski – G, Creighton (junior)

==== College seniors ====
"Redshirt" refers to players who were redshirt seniors in the 2020–21 season. "Graduate" refers to players who were graduate transfers in 2020–21.

- (United States) Derrick Alston Jr. – F, Boise State (redshirt)
- (United States) Jose Alvarado – G, Georgia Tech
- (United States) Jonah Antonio – G, Wake Forest
- (Germany) Jonathan Baehre – F, Clemson
- (United States) Mitch Ballock – G, Creighton
- (United States) Troy Baxter Jr. – F, Morgan State
- (United States) Chudier Bile – F, Georgetown
- (United States) Jahvon Blair – G, Georgetown
- (United States) Isaac Bonton – G, Washington State
- (United States) Chaundee Brown – G, Michigan
- (United States) Marcus Burk – G, IUPUI (redshirt)
- (United States) Jordan Burns – G, Colgate
- (Puerto Rico) Manny Camper – G/F, Siena
- (United States) Nahziah Carter – G/F, Washington
- (United States) Arinze Chidom – F, UC Riverside
- (United States) Matt Coleman III – G, Texas
- (United States) Trevion Crews – G, Bethel (IN)
- (United States) T. J. Crockett – G, Lindenwood
- (United States) Jalen Crutcher – G, Dayton
- (United States) Ryan Daly – G, Saint Joseph's (redshirt)
- (United States) Zaccheus Darko-Kelly – G/F, Providence (MT) (redshirt)
- (Germany) Oscar da Silva – F, Stanford
- (United States) Cartier Diarra – G, Virginia Tech
- (Slovakia) Marek Dolezaj – F, Syracuse
- (Dominican Republic) Chris Duarte – G, Oregon
- (United States) Ian DuBose – G, Wake Forest
- (United States) Juwan Durham – C, Notre Dame
- (United States) Tahj Eaddy – G, USC
- (United States) Lydell Elmore – F, High Point
- (United States) Romeao Ferguson – G, Lipscomb
- (Dominican Republic) L. J. Figueroa – G, Oregon
- (Puerto Rico) Aleem Ford – F, Wisconsin
- (United States) Blake Francis – G, Richmond
- (United States) D. J. Funderburk – F/C, NC State
- (United States) Ty Gadsden – G, UNC Wilmington
- (Australia) Gorjok Gak – C, California Baptist
- (United States) Marcus Garrett – G, Kansas
- (United States) Luka Garza – C, Iowa
- (United States) Samson George – F, Central Arkansas
- (United States) Asante Gist – G, Iona
- (United States) Terrell Gomez – G, San Diego State
- (United States) Jordan Goodwin – G, Saint Louis
- (United States) Justin Gorham – F, Houston (redshirt)
- (United States) Elyjah Goss – F, IUPUI
- (United States) Jayvon Graves – G, Buffalo
- (United States) Quade Green – G, Washington
- (Netherlands) Matt Haarms – C, BYU (graduate)
- (United States) Javion Hamlet – G, North Texas (redshirt)
- (United States) Deion Hammond – G, Monmouth
- (United States) Amauri Hardy – G, Oregon
- (United States) Romio Harvey – G, Harding
- (United States) Sam Hauser – F, Virginia (redshirt)
- (United States) Kashaun Hicks – G, Norfolk State
- (United States) Taveion Hollingsworth – G, Western Kentucky
- (United States) Jay Huff – F/C, Virginia (redshirt)
- (United States) Anthony Hughes Jr. – G, Millsaps
- (Puerto Rico) Jhivvan Jackson – G, UTSA
- (United States) Loren Cristian Jackson – G, Akron (redshirt)
- (United States) Casdon Jardine – G/F, Hawaiʻi
- (United States) DeJon Jarreau – G, Houston
- (United States) Tristan Jarrett – G, Jackson State
- (United States) Justin Jaworski – G, Lafayette
- (United States) Damien Jefferson – F, Creighton (redshirt)
- (United States) Bryson Johnson – G, Ozarks
- (United States) Carlik Jones – G, Louisville (graduate)
- (United States) Herbert Jones – F, Alabama
- (United States) Corey Kispert – F, Gonzaga
- (United States) Cameron Krutwig – C, Loyola Chicago
- (United States) Matt Lewis – G, James Madison
- (United States) Spencer Littleson – G, Toledo
- (United States) Isaiah Livers – G/F, Michigan
- (United States) Denzel Mahoney – G, Creighton (redshirt)
- (Australia) Makuach Maluach – G, New Mexico
- (Georgia (country)) Sandro Mamukelashvili – F/C, Seton Hall
- (United States) Kyle Mangas – G, Indiana Wesleyan
- (United States) JaQuori McLaughlin – G, UC Santa Barbara
- (United States) Jadyn Michael – G, Colorado Christian
- (United States) Isaiah Miller – G, UNC Greensboro
- (Denmark) Asbjørn Midtgaard – C, Grand Canyon
- (United States) Damek Mitchell – G, Lewis–Clark State
- (United States) Matt Mitchell – F, San Diego State
- (United States) Steffon Mitchell – G, Boston College
- (United States) Ruot Monyyong – F, Little Rock
- (United States) Clay Mounce – G/F, Furman
- (United States) Matthew Moyer – F, George Washington
- (United States) Obadiah Noel – G, UMass Lowell
- (United States) Kobi Nwandu – G, Niagara
- (Canada) Eugene Omoruyi – F, Oregon (redshirt)
- (United States) EJ Onu – F/C, Shawnee State
- (United States) Chris Parker – G, Liberty
- (Australia) Jock Perry – C, UC Riverside (redshirt)
- (United States) John Petty Jr. – G, Alabama
- (United States) Jamorko Pickett – F, Georgetown
- (United States) Danny Pippen – F, Kent State (redshirt)
- (France) Yves Pons – F, Tennessee
- (United States) Micah Potter – F, Wisconsin (redshirt)
- (United States) Brandon Rachal – F, Tulsa
- (United States) Austin Reaves – G, Oklahoma (redshirt)
- (United States) Nate Reuvers – C, Wisconsin
- (United States) Elvin Rodriguez – G, USAO
- (United States) Colbey Ross – G, Pepperdine
- (France) Olivier Sarr – C, Kentucky
- (United States) Jordan Schakel – G, San Diego State
- (United States) Devontae Shuler – G, Ole Miss
- (United States) Aamir Simms – F, Clemson
- (United States) Jericho Sims – F, Texas
- (United States) Chris Smith – F, UCLA
- (United States) Dru Smith – G, Missouri (redshirt)
- (United States) Justin Smith – F, Arkansas
- (United States) Mike Smith – G, Michigan (graduate)
- (United States) Anthony Tarke – G, Coppin State (redshirt)
- (United States) Jalen Tate – G, Arkansas
- (United States) Terry Taylor – G/F, Austin Peay
- (United States) MaCio Teague – G, Baylor (redshirt)
- (United States) Christian Terrell – G, Sacramento State (redshirt)
- (United States) Koby Thomas – G, Coppin State
- (Puerto Rico) Ethan Thompson – G, Oregon State
- (United States) Jeremiah Tilmon – F, Missouri
- (United States) D'Mitrik Trice – G, Wisconsin (redshirt)
- (Canada) Jordy Tshimanga – F, Dayton (redshirt)
- (United States) Justin Turner – G, Bowling Green (redshirt)
- (United States) Chandler Vaudrin – G, Winthrop (redshirt)
- (Spain) Eric Vila – F/C, UTEP (redshirt)
- (United States) Mark Vital – G/F, Baylor (redshirt)
- (United States) M. J. Walker – G, Florida State
- (United States) Keaton Wallace – G, UTSA
- (United States) Josh Washburn – G, Carthage
- (United States) Isaiah Washington – G, Long Beach State
- (United States) Romello White – F, Ole Miss (graduate)
- (United States) Devin Whitfield – G, Lincoln Memorial (redshirt)
- (United States) McKinley Wright IV – G, Colorado
- (United States) Moses Wright – F, Georgia Tech

==== International players ====
International players that declared for this draft and did not previously declare in another prior draft could drop out 10 days before the event, on July 19. A total of 51 international players withdrew their names from consideration for the draft, with only the following eight prospects remaining after the international deadline.

- Juhann Begarin – G, Paris Basketball (France)
- Vrenz Bleijenbergh – F, Antwerp Giants (Belgium)
- (Senegal) Biram Faye – C, Bàsquet Girona (Spain)
- Usman Garuba – F, Real Madrid (Spain)
- Josh Giddey – G, Adelaide 36ers (Australia)
- Rokas Jokubaitis – G, Žalgiris Kaunas (Lithuania)
- Alperen Şengün – C, Beşiktaş Icrypex (Turkey)
- (Senegal) Amar Sylla – C, Filou Oostende (Belgium)

=== Automatically eligible entrants ===
Players who do not meet the criteria for "international" players are automatically eligible if they meet any of the following criteria:

- They have no remaining college eligibility.
- If they graduated from high school in the U.S., but did not enroll in a U.S. college or university, four years have passed since their high school class graduated.
- They have signed a contract with a professional basketball team not in the NBA, anywhere in the world, and have played under the contract.

As noted above, the NCAA's COVID-19 eligibility waiver for 2020–21 resulted in all college seniors having remaining eligibility, leading to the NBA and its players' union agreeing that seniors would have to declare for the 2021 draft.

Players who meet the criteria for "international" players are automatically eligible if they meet any of the following criteria:

- They are at least 22 years old during the calendar year of the draft. In term of dates players born on or before December 31, 1999, were automatically eligible for the 2021 draft.
- They have signed a contract with a professional basketball team not in the NBA within the United States, and have played under that contract.

Other automatically eligible players
Player	Team	Note	Ref.
(Australia) Owen Hulland	Adelaide 36ers (Australia)	Left Hawaii in 2020; playing professionally since the 2020–21 season	
(Serbia) Filip Petrušev	Mega Basket (Serbia)	Left Gonzaga in 2020; playing professionally since the 2020–21 season	
(Australia) Isaac White	The Hawks (Australia)	Left Stanford in 2020; playing professionally since the 2020–21 season	

== Invited attendees ==
After previously not having a proper "green room" invitation process for the 2020 NBA draft due to the COVID-19 pandemic (with players instead being conducted interviews and showings through videotelephony), the NBA allowed for invites to attend the NBA draft event once again this season. The NBA usually annually invites players to sit in the so-called "green room", a special room set aside at the draft site for the invited players plus their families and agents, with 2020 being considered an exception due to the unprecedented nature of COVID-19 impacting the world at the time. This year, a reported 20 players were invited (listed alphabetically).

- (United States) Scottie Barnes, Florida State
- (United States) James Bouknight, Connecticut
- (United States) Cade Cunningham, Oklahoma State
- (Dominican Republic) Chris Duarte, Oregon
- (United States) Jalen Green, NBA G League Ignite (NBA G League)
- Josh Giddey, Adelaide 36ers (Australia)
- (United States) Isaiah Jackson, Kentucky
- (United States) Jalen Johnson, Duke
- (United States) Keon Johnson, Tennessee
- (The Bahamas) Kai Jones, Texas
- (United States) Corey Kispert, Gonzaga
- (Democratic Republic of the Congo) Jonathan Kuminga, NBA G League Ignite (NBA G League)
- (United States) Davion Mitchell, Baylor
- (United States) Evan Mobley, USC
- (United States) Moses Moody, Arkansas
- Alperen Şengün, Beşiktaş Icrypex (Turkey)
- (United States) Jalen Suggs, Gonzaga
- (United States) Cameron Thomas, LSU
- (Germany) Franz Wagner, Michigan
- (United States) Ziaire Williams, Stanford

== See also ==
- List of first overall NBA draft picks
