= Jaylen Martin =

American basketball player (born 2004)

No. 24 – Rip City Remix
- Position: Shooting guard / small forward
- League: NBA G League

Personal information
- Born: January 28, 2004 (age 22) Quincy, Florida, U.S.
- Listed height: 6 ft 6 in (1.98 m)
- Listed weight: 216 lb (98 kg)

Career information
- High school: Florida State University School (Tallahassee, Florida)
- NBA draft: 2023: undrafted
- Playing career: 2022–present

Career history
- 2022–2023: YNG Dreamerz
- 2023–2024: Westchester Knicks
- 2024–2025: Brooklyn Nets
- 2024–2025: →Long Island Nets
- 2025: Delaware Blue Coats
- 2025: Washington Wizards
- 2025: →Capital City Go-Go
- 2025–2026: Delaware Blue Coats
- 2026–present: Rip City Remix
- Stats at NBA.com
- Stats at Basketball Reference

Jaylen Amir Martin (born January 28, 2004) is an American professional basketball player for the Rip City Remix of the NBA G League. Prior to playing in the National Basketball Association (NBA), he played for the YNG Dreamerz of the Overtime Elite League (OTE).

== High school career ==
Martin played high school basketball at Florida State University High School in Tallahassee, Florida under head coach and former NBA player Charlie Ward.

=== Recruiting ===
Coming out of high school, Martin was a highly ranked recruit in the class of 2022. He was ranked as a 4-star recruit by both ESPN and 247Sports recruiting services.

Despite receiving collegiate offers from Florida, Georgia, Georgetown, Wake Forest, Cincinnati, Texas Tech and Ole Miss, he committed to play professionally in the Overtime Elite league.

== Professional career ==
=== YNG Dreamerz (2022–2023) ===
Martin began his professional career playing for the YNG Dreamerz of the Overtime Elite league. He finished second in Overtime Elite's Most Improved Player voting and led the Dreamerz to the league Championship series, losing to the City Reapers.

=== Westchester Knicks (2023–2024) ===
After going undrafted in the 2023 NBA draft, Martin signed a two-way contract with the New York Knicks on July 3, 2023, but was waived on October 18. On November 9, he was named to the opening night roster for the Westchester Knicks and on November 27, he signed another two-way contract with New York. However, he was waived on December 23 without playing for New York and returned to Westchester three days later.

=== Brooklyn / Long Island Nets (2024–2025) ===
On February 21, 2024, Martin signed a two-way contract with the Brooklyn Nets, but was waived on January 1, 2025.

=== Delaware Blue Coats (2025) ===
On January 11, 2025, Martin joined the Delaware Blue Coats after his rights were traded from the Westchester Knicks in exchange for the returning player rights of David Duke Jr. and a 2025 future first-round pick.

=== Washington Wizards / Capital City Go-Go (2025) ===
On February 8, 2025, Martin signed a two-way contract with the Washington Wizards.

== Career statistics ==
Legend
GP	Games played	GS	Games started	MPG	Minutes per game
FG%	Field goal percentage	3P%	3-point field goal percentage	FT%	Free throw percentage
RPG	Rebounds per game	APG	Assists per game	SPG	Steals per game
BPG	Blocks per game	PPG	Points per game	**Bold**	Career high

=== NBA ===
==== Regular season ====
Year	Team	GP	GS	MPG	FG%	3P%	FT%	RPG	APG	SPG	BPG	PPG
2024–25	Brooklyn	3	0	1.6	**.500**	**1.000**	—	.0	.0	.0	.0	1.0
2024–25	Washington	**13**	0	**18.0**	.417	.273	**.900**	**3.4**	**1.3**	**.7**	.0	**5.8**
Career		16	0	14.9	.419	.304	.900	2.8	1.1	.6	.0	4.9
