= Kok Yat =

American basketball player (born 2003)

Free Agent
- Position: Shooting guard / point guard

Personal information
- Born: June 12, 2003 (age 23) Anchorage, Alaska, U.S.
- Listed height: 6 ft 8 in (2.03 m)
- Listed weight: 200 lb (91 kg)

Career information
- High school: Norcross (Norcross, Georgia)
- NBA draft: 2023: undrafted
- Playing career: 2021–present

Career history
- 2021–2022: Cold Hearts
- 2022–2024: Iowa Wolves
- 2024–2025: Texas Legends

Kok Yat (born June 12, 2003) is an American professional basketball player. He previously played for the Texas Legends, Iowa Wolves and Overtime Elite.

== Early life ==
Kok Yat was born on June 12, 2003, in Anchorage, Alaska. Yat attended Romig Middle School.

Yat moved to Georgia and enrolled at Norcross High School. He was rated as a consensus three-star recruit and received offers from DePaul University, Kansas, Auburn, and TCU, amongst others. However, he chose to commit to the Blue Demons. He de-committed from the college following the firing of Dave Leitao. Yat then decided to bypass college and play in Overtime Elite.

== Professional career ==
=== Cold Hearts (2021-2023) ===
In 2021, Yat signed a six-figure professional contract with Overtime Elite. He became the 17th player to sign with OTE. During his rookie season with the Cold Hearts, Yat appeared in nine games before suffering a season-ending injury. He scored in double digits in five games. In seven of his nine games, Yat had a block, and during opening night, Yat recorded a career-high 4 blocks. Yat had a season-high 19 points with five three pointers against Liberty Heights. In his rookie season, Yat averaged 10.9 points, 4.3 rebounds, 0.8 assists, 1.2 blocks, and 0.6 steals per game.

In 2022–2023, Yat averaged 6.3 points per game before suffering a season-ending injury.

=== Iowa Wolves (2023-2025) ===
After going undrafted in the 2023 NBA Draft, Yat joined the Minnesota Timberwolves for the 2023 NBA Summer League. In three games, Yat averaged 0.7 rebounds per game. On October 28, 2023, the Iowa Wolves selected Yat with the 23rd pick in the first round of the 2023 NBA G League draft. As a rookie, Yat appeared in 26 games and averaged 4.8 points and 1.2 rebounds in 13.1 minutes per game.

During the 2024–2025 season, Yat averaged 3.2 points and 0.8 rebounds in 11.2 minutes per game. In July, Yat joined the 2024 NBA Summer League, where he played one game and grabbed one rebound.

=== Texas Legends (2025) ===
On February 7, 2025, Yat signed with the Texas Legends.

== Personal life ==
Kok Yat is cousins with former NBA player JT Thor.
