= JT Thor =

American basketball player (born 2002)

No. 4 – Pallacanestro Reggiana
- Position: Power forward
- League: Lega Basket Serie A

Personal information
- Born: August 26, 2002 (age 24) Omaha, Nebraska, U.S.
- Listed height: 6 ft 9 in (2.06 m)
- Listed weight: 203 lb (92 kg)

Career information
- High school: West Anchorage (Anchorage, Alaska); Huntington Prep (Huntington, West Virginia); Norcross (Norcross, Georgia)
- College: Auburn (2020–2021)
- NBA draft: 2021: 2nd round, 37th overall pick
- Drafted by: Detroit Pistons
- Playing career: 2021–present

Career history
- 2021–2024: Charlotte Hornets
- 2021–2022: →Greensboro Swarm
- 2024–2025: Cleveland Cavaliers
- 2024–2025: →Cleveland Charge
- 2025: Washington Wizards
- 2025: →Capital City Go-Go
- 2025–present: Pallacanestro Reggiana
- Stats at NBA.com
- Stats at Basketball Reference

Jokhow Panom "JT" Thor (born August 26, 2002) is a South Sudanese American professional basketball player for Pallacanestro Reggiana of the Italian Lega Basket Serie A (LBA). He played college basketball for the Auburn Tigers and was selected by the Detroit Pistons with the 37th overall pick in the 2021 NBA draft.

== Early life ==
Thor was born in Omaha, Nebraska, to South Sudanese parents and moved to Anchorage, Alaska, at age five. He started playing basketball in seventh grade and competed for West Anchorage High School. At age 14, Thor moved to West Virginia, where his brother lived, to attend Huntington Prep School. After two seasons, he transferred to Norcross High School in Norcross, Georgia. He reclassified to the 2020 class. As a senior, Thor averaged 14.9 points and 6.6 rebounds per game, receiving all-state honors. He was a consensus four-star recruit and committed to playing college basketball for Auburn, choosing the Tigers over Oklahoma State.

== College career ==
On February 13, 2021, Thor recorded a freshman season-high 24 points and nine rebounds, shooting 5-of-6 from three-point range, in an 82–80 loss to Kentucky. As a freshman at Auburn, he averaged 9.4 points, five rebounds and 1.4 blocks per game. On March 23, 2021, Thor declared for the 2021 NBA draft while maintaining his college eligibility. He later signed with an agent, forgoing his remaining eligibility.

== Professional career ==
=== Charlotte Hornets (2021–2024) ===
Thor was selected 37th overall by the Detroit Pistons in the 2021 NBA draft. On August 6, he was traded to the Charlotte Hornets with Mason Plumlee for the 57th overall pick. The Hornets officially signed Thor on August 6, 2021. On October 26 and November 2, he was assigned to the Greensboro Swarm of the NBA G League. In his G League debut, Thor posted 34 points off of 14-of-22 shooting and grabbed 12 rebounds in a 128–117 loss to the Birmingham Squadron. The Hornets released Thor on June 28, 2024, along with guard Seth Curry.

=== Cleveland Cavaliers (2024–2025) ===
On September 9, 2024, Thor signed a two-way contract with the Cleveland Cavaliers. On March 1, 2025, the Cleveland Cavaliers waived Thor.

=== Washington Wizards (2025) ===
On March 3, 2025, Thor was claimed off waivers by the Washington Wizards. He made 11 appearances for Washington, averaging 3.9 points, 3.8 rebounds, and 0.5 assists.

=== Pallacanestro Reggiana (2025–present) ===
On November 11, 2025, Thor signed with Pallacanestro Reggiana of the Italian Lega Basket Serie A. He made 23 appearances for the team, recording averages of 8.8 points, 4.6 rebounds, and 1.2 blocks.

On June 26, 2026, Thor re–signed with the team on a one–year contract.

== Career statistics ==
Legend
| GP | Games played | GS | Games started | MPG | Minutes per game |
| FG% | Field goal percentage | 3P% | 3-point field goal percentage | FT% | Free throw percentage |
| RPG | Rebounds per game | APG | Assists per game | SPG | Steals per game |
| BPG | Blocks per game | PPG | Points per game | **Bold** | Career high |

=== NBA ===
| Year | Team | GP | GS | MPG | FG% | 3P% | FT% | RPG | APG | SPG | BPG | PPG |
|---|---|---|---|---|---|---|---|---|---|---|---|---|
| 2021–22 | Charlotte | 33 | 0 | 7.9 | .436 | .259 | .600 | 1.3 | **.6** | .2 | .3 | 2.0 |
| 2022–23 | Charlotte | **69** | **8** | 14.0 | .399 | .317 | .702 | 2.2 | .5 | .3 | .3 | 3.8 |
| 2023–24 | Charlotte | 63 | 3 | 12.4 | .437 | .346 | .550 | 2.3 | .5 | .2 | **.4** | 3.2 |
| 2024–25 | Cleveland | 9 | 0 | 4.7 | **.600** | **.500** | **.875** | .7 | .5 | .2 | .3 | 3.1 |
| 2024–25 | Washington | 11 | 0 | **18.8** | .364 | .200 | .571 | **3.8** | .5 | **.5** | **.5** | **3.9** |
| Career | | 185 | 11 | 12.2 | .419 | .317 | .651 | 2.1 | .5 | .3 | .4 | 3.2 |

=== College ===
| Year | Team | GP | GS | MPG | FG% | 3P% | FT% | RPG | APG | SPG | BPG | PPG |
|---|---|---|---|---|---|---|---|---|---|---|---|---|
| 2020–21 | Auburn | 27 | 27 | 23.0 | .440 | .297 | .741 | 5.0 | .9 | .8 | 1.4 | 9.4 |

== Personal life ==
Thor's older cousin, Jal Rial, played basketball for Phoenix College and Howard College. Thor's younger cousin, Kok Yat, played professionally for the NBA G League, where he played for the Iowa Wolves and Texas Legends. He has four brothers and three sisters.
