= Norcross High School =

American public high school

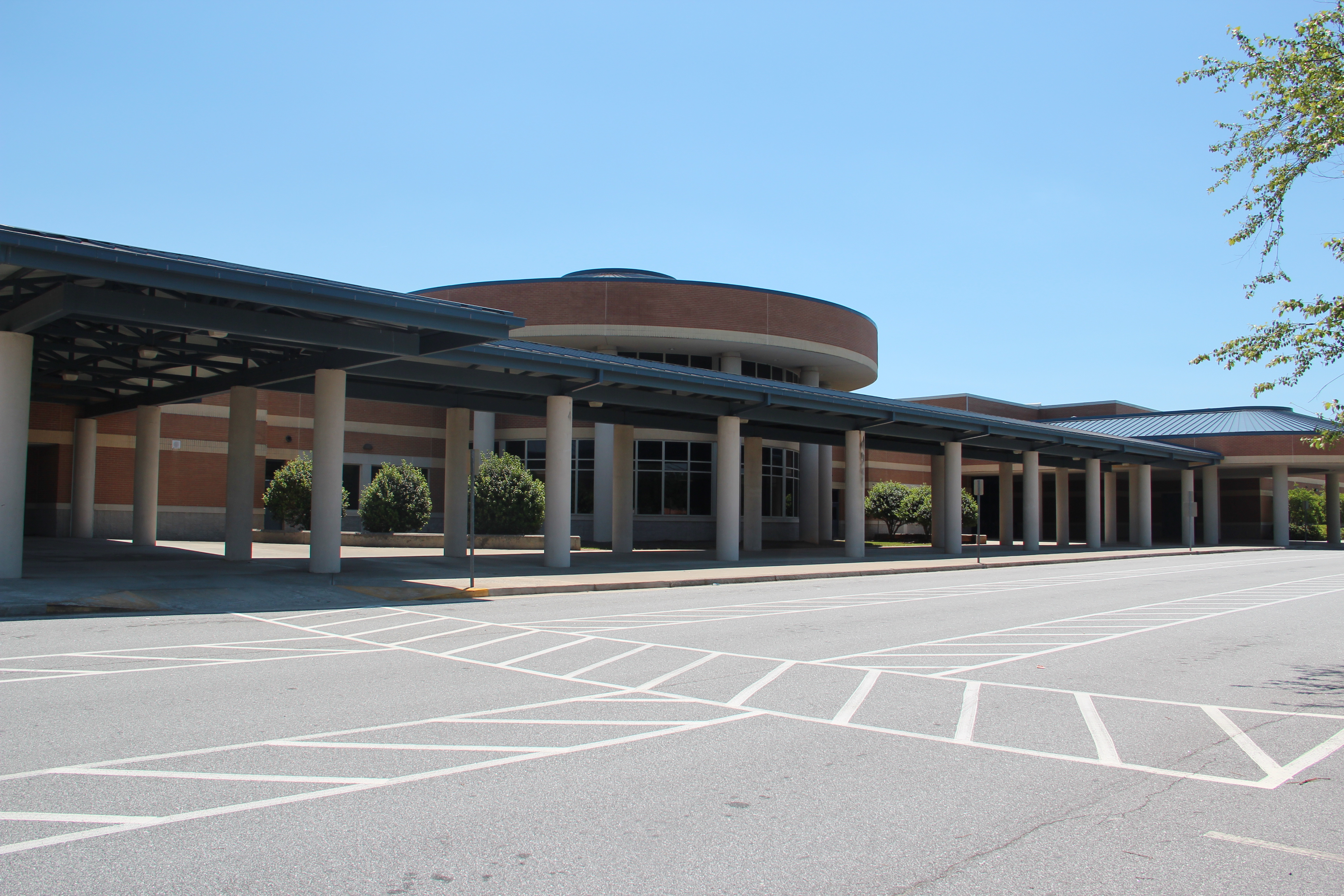
- Norcross High School front entrance

Location
- 5300 Spalding Drive; Norcross, Georgia 30092; United States; 33°58′01″N 84°12′44″W

Information
- School type: Public high school
- Established: 1903 (Norcross High); 1957 (West Gwinnett High); 1962 (Norcross High); 2001 (Current location)
- School district: Gwinnett County Public Schools
- Principal: Will Bishop
- Teaching staff: 170.60 (on an FTE basis)
- Grades: 9–12
- Enrollment: 2,395 (2023–2024)
- Student to teacher ratio: 14.04
- Classes offered: 3DE by Junior Achievement; Advanced Placement; International Baccalaureate
- Campus size: 10.1 acres (4.1 ha)
- Colors: Blue, silver, and white
- Athletics conference: Georgia High School Association
- Nickname: Blue Devils
- Website: https://www.gcpsk12.org/norcrosshs

Norcross High School is a public high school in Norcross, Georgia, United States, part of the Gwinnett County School System, and serving the cities of Norcross and Peachtree Corners. The school's mascot is the Blue Devil.

The school is also the first in the Gwinnett County Public School System to offer the IB Diploma Programme, first implemented in 1999.

== Athletics ==
Norcross competes in Region 7-AAAAAAA. The school's mascot is the Blue Devil. The school competes in football, baseball, softball, lacrosse, track and field, cross country, swimming and diving, wrestling, golf, soccer, tennis, volleyball, marching band, and competitive cheerleading.

Norcross varsity boys' basketball team won the Class AAAAA Georgia state championship in 2006, 2007, 2008 and 2011, and the Class AAAAAA state championship 2013 and 2022. The girls won the basketball state championship in 2010, 2011, and 2022.

The Norcross football team won the 2012 and 2013 state championships.

== Notable alumni ==
- Al-Farouq Aminu (2008), former NBA basketball player
- Jeff Backus, former NFL football player
- Brandon Boston Jr. (2020, transferred), NBA basketball player
- Brice Butler, NFL football player
- Jake Camarda, NFL football player
- Lorenzo Carter, former NFL football player
- Jason Croom, NFL football player
- Geremy Davis, NFL football player
- Kaela Davis (2013, transferred), former WNBA basketball player
- Diamond DeShields, WNBA basketball player
- Max Garcia, NFL football player
- Brandon Goodwin (2013), NBA basketball player
- Larry Grant, former NFL football player
- Dearica Hamby (2011), WNBA All-Star forward
- Rayshaun Hammonds, basketball player who plays professionally in South Korea
- Chris Herndon, NFL football player
- Alvin Kamara, NFL football player
- Jeremy Lamb, NBA basketball player
- Gani Lawal (2007), former NBA basketball player
- Lawson Luckie, college football tight end
- Chandler Massey, actor
- Jodie Meeks (2006), NBA basketball player
- Dohnte Meyers, CFL football player
- JT Thor (2020), NBA basketball player
- Lajon Witherspoon, lead singer of Sevendust
- Nic Stone, author
- Kok Yat - former NBA G-League player for the Iowa Wolves and Texas Legends.

== Other programs ==
In 1996, Norcross High School's band received the Legion of Honor award from the John Philip Sousa Foundation, marking their first official award from the foundation.
