= Nojel Eastern =

American basketball player (born 1999)

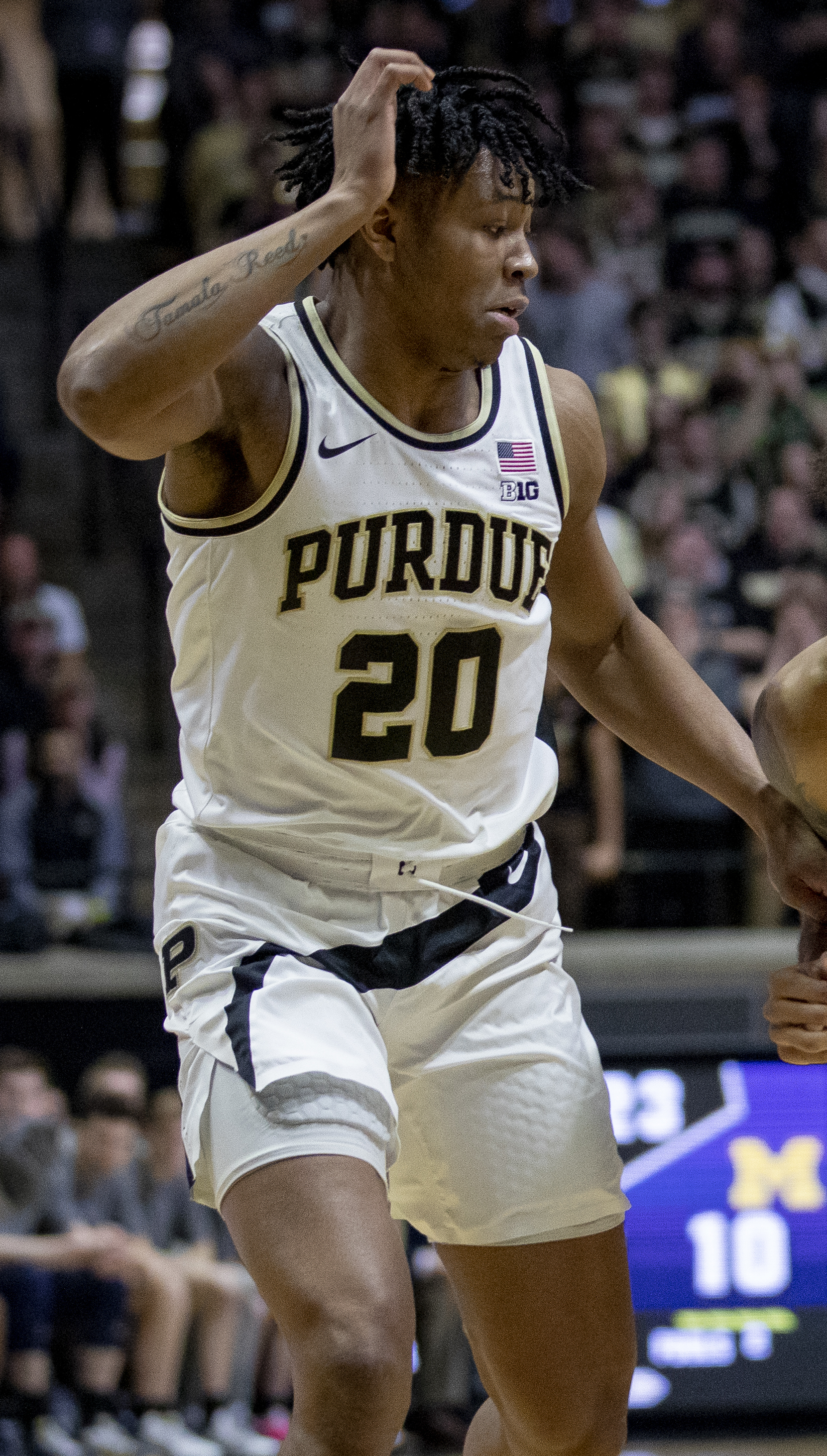
- Eastern with Purdue in 2020

No. 20 – Ostioneros de Guaymas
- Position: Point guard / shooting guard
- League: CIBACOPA

Personal information
- Born: May 26, 1999 (age 27) Chicago, Illinois, U.S.
- Listed height: 6 ft 5 in (1.96 m)
- Listed weight: 246 lb (112 kg)

Career information
- High school: Evanston Township (Evanston, Illinois)
- College: Purdue (2017–2020)
- NBA draft: 2021: undrafted
- Playing career: 2023–present

Career history
- 2023: Rayos de Hermosillo
- 2023: Halcones Rojos Veracruz
- 2023–2025: Iowa Wolves
- 2026–: Ostioneros de Guaymas

Career highlights
- CIBACOPA All-Star (2023); 2× Big Ten All-Defensive Team (2019, 2020)
- Stats at NBA.com
- Stats at Basketball Reference
Medals
Men's basketball
Representing United States
Summer Universiade
Silver medal – second place	2017 Taipei	Team

Nojel Imani Eastern (born May 26, 1999) is an American professional basketball player for the Iowa Wolves of the NBA G League. He played college basketball for three seasons with the Purdue Boilermakers, then transferred to Howard University before ultimately opting out of the season, then entered the 2021 NBA draft, but was not selected.

== Early life ==
Eastern's first name, Nojel, is an ananym of his father's name, Lejon. He was raised by his mother, Tamala Reed, who worked for the Chicago Transit Authority. Eastern had attention deficit hyperactivity disorder since his youth. Even though his mother worked in Chicago, he attended school in Evanston, Illinois due to the district's superior academics. From fourth to eighth grade, Eastern lived with Travis Ransom, a family friend.

== High school career ==
Eastern played four years of varsity basketball for Evanston Township High School in Evanston. As a sophomore, he averaged 15.7 points, 5.3 rebounds and three assists per game, leading his team to the Central Suburban League South championship and a Class 4A regional title. In April 2015, Eastern dislocated his left ankle and fractured two bones in it during an Amateur Athletic Union game, before undergoing surgery. In his junior season, he averaged 14.9 points, 6.5 rebounds and four assists per game, helping Evanston Township win Central Suburban South and Class 4A regional titles. As a senior, Eastern averaged 15.6 points, 7.1 rebounds and 4.2 assists per game and was named Pioneer Press All-Area Player of the Year. He was the runner-up to Mark Smith for the Illinois Mr. Basketball award.

=== Recruiting ===
On November 16, 2016, Eastern committed to play college basketball for Purdue over offers from Michigan State, Ohio State, DePaul and Seton Hall, among others. He was drawn to Purdue because of its coaching staff and its proximity. Eastern was considered a consensus four-star recruit by major recruiting services.

College recruiting
Name	Hometown	School	Height	Weight	Commit date
Nojel Eastern; SG	Evanston, IL	Evanston Township (IL)	6 ft 6 in (1.98 m)	207 lb (94 kg)	Nov 16, 2016
Nojel Eastern; SG	Recruit ratings: Rivals: 247Sports: ESPN: (83)				
Overall recruit ranking: Rivals: 77 247Sports: 59 ESPN: 84
Note: In many cases, Scout, Rivals, 247Sports, On3, and ESPN may conflict in their listings of height and weight.; In these cases, the average was taken. ESPN grades are on a 100-point scale.; Sources: "Purdue 2017 Basketball Commitments". Rivals.; "2017 Purdue Boilermakers Recruiting Class". ESPN.; "2017 Team Ranking". Rivals.

== College career ==
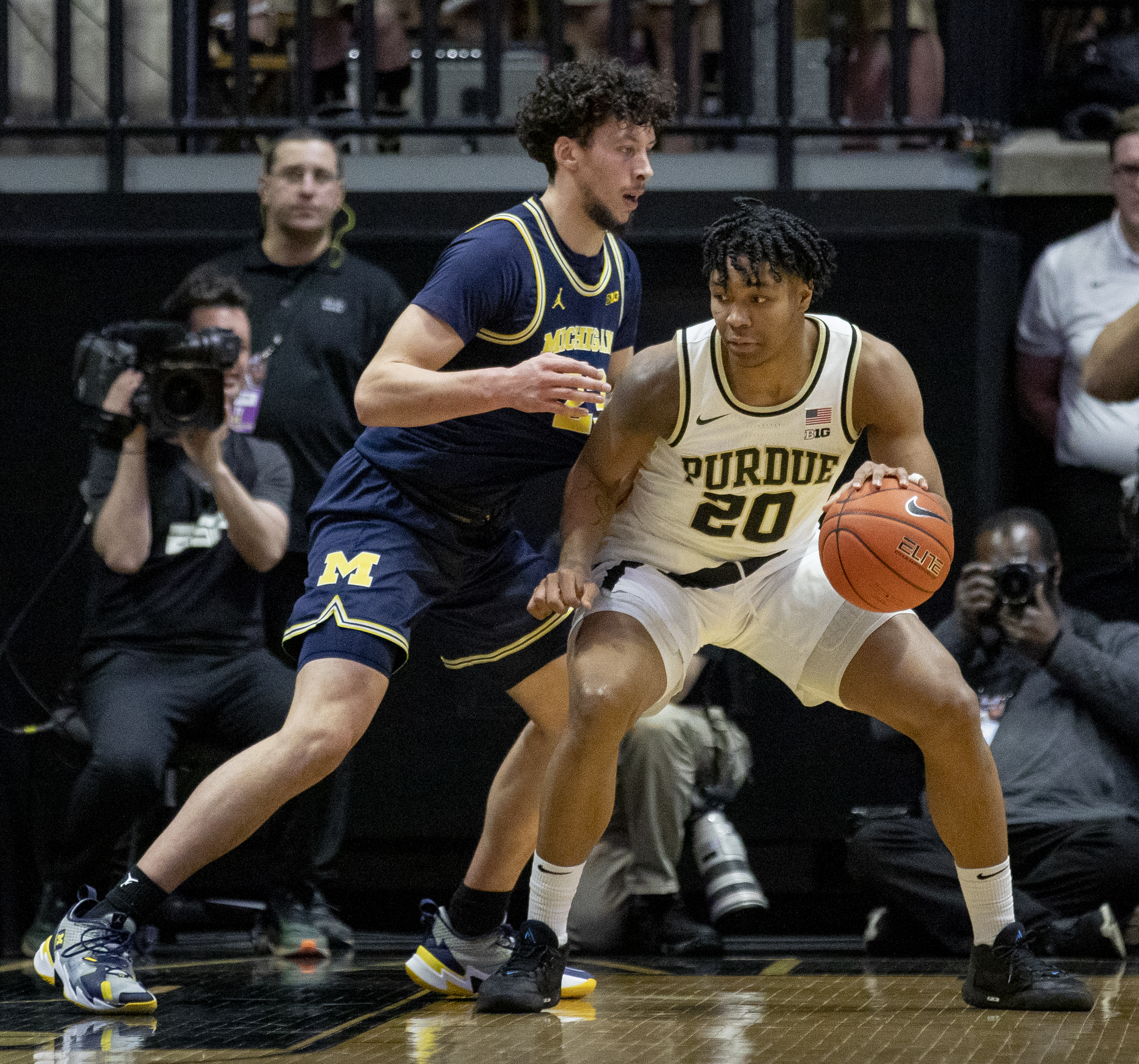
Eastern defended by Brandon Johns Jr. of Michigan in February 2020

As a freshman at Purdue, Eastern averaged 2.9 points, 2.5 rebounds and 1.1 assists per game in the role of a defensive specialist off the bench. After the season, he declared for the 2018 NBA draft without hiring an agent, before withdrawing from the draft. On March 9, 2019, Eastern scored a career-high 15 points in a 70–57 win over Northwestern. In his sophomore season, he became a regular starter and averaged 7.5 points, a team-high 5.5 rebounds, 2.5 assists and 1.1 steals per game, earning Big Ten Conference All-Defensive honors. Eastern became the first Purdue point guard to lead the team in rebounding since at least 1954. By the time he was a junior, he became Purdue's top defender, with the ability to guard all five positions. As a junior, Eastern averaged 4.9 points, four rebounds and 2.7 assists per game, earning Big Ten All-Defensive accolades for a second time. He led his team in assists and steals. Following the season, he declared for the 2020 NBA draft.

On May 12, 2020, Eastern announced that he would transfer from Purdue. Two days later, he committed to Michigan for his senior season. However, on June 17, Eastern announced that he would not play for Michigan after he was unable to clear the admission to the school. On August 6, 2020, Eastern committed to continue his career at Howard. Before playing a game, he quit the team on January 3, 2021, to pursue a professional career and train for the 2021 NBA draft.

== Professional career ==
=== Rayos de Hermosillo (2023) ===
After going undrafted in the 2021 NBA draft, Eastern joined the Long Island Nets for training camp after a successful tryout. However, he was waived on October 27, 2021.

On March 10, 2023, Eastern debuted with the Rayos de Hermosillo of the Circuito de Baloncesto de la Costa del Pacífico (CIBACOPA). He earned All-Star honors.

=== Halcones Rojos Veracruz (2023) ===
On August 4, 2023, Eastern signed with Halcones Rojos Veracruz from the Mexican LNBP.

=== Iowa Wolves (2023–present) ===
On October 29, 2023, Eastern was picked 41st overall in the 2023 NBA G League draft by the Iowa Wolves. In a 125-120 victory over the Stockton Kings on February 8, 2025, he scored a career-high 34 points. In the 2024-25 season, Eastern averaged 12.9 points, 2.9 assists, 5.4 rebounds and 1.4 steals per game. He was signed by the Minnesota Timberwolves on September 17. Eastern was waived the following day. On November 6, 2025, Eastern was named to the Iowa Wolves opening night roster.

== National team career ==
Eastern and his Purdue teammates represented the United States at the 2017 Summer Universiade in Taipei. He averaged 5.6 points, 2.4 rebounds and 2.4 assists in 14.5 minutes per game, helping his team win the silver medal.

== Career statistics ==
Legend
GP	Games played	GS	Games started	MPG	Minutes per game
FG%	Field goal percentage	3P%	3-point field goal percentage	FT%	Free throw percentage
RPG	Rebounds per game	APG	Assists per game	SPG	Steals per game
BPG	Blocks per game	PPG	Points per game	**Bold**	Career high

=== College ===
Year	Team	GP	GS	MPG	FG%	3P%	FT%	RPG	APG	SPG	BPG	PPG
2017–18	Purdue	**37**	0	12.6	.483	**.333**	.417	2.5	1.1	.6	.1	2.9
2018–19	Purdue	36	**35**	**28.2**	**.495**	.000	**.650**	**5.5**	2.5	**1.1**	**.3**	**7.5**
2019–20	Purdue	31	27	25.5	.420	.000	.485	4.0	**2.7**	**1.1**	.2	4.9
Career		104	62	21.8	.466	.188	.558	4.0	2.0	.9	.2	5.1
