= Tray Maddox =

American basketball player (born 2000)

Alba Fehérvár
- Position: Shooting guard
- League: Nemzeti Bajnokság I/A

Personal information
- Born: August 13, 2000 (age 26) Novi, Michigan, U.S.
- Listed height: 6 ft 6 in (1.98 m)
- Listed weight: 200 lb (91 kg)

Career information
- High school: Novi (Novi, Michigan)
- College: Oakland (2018–2020); Cal State Fullerton (2020–2022); Western Michigan (2022–2023)
- NBA draft: 2023: undrafted
- Playing career: 2023–present

Career history
- 2023–2024: Osceola Magic
- 2024: Cleveland Charge
- 2024–2025: Windsor Express
- 2025: Texas Legends
- 2025: Astros de Jalisco
- 2026: Beirut Club
- 2026: Al Nawair
- 2026–present: Alba Fehérvár

Traveon Kierr Maddox Jr. (born August 13, 2000) is an American professional basketball player for Alba Fehérvár of the Nemzeti Bajnokság I/A. He played college basketball for the Oakland Golden Grizzlies, Cal State Fullerton Titans and Western Michigan Broncos.

== Early life ==
Maddox was born in Novi, Michigan, on August 13, 2000. He played basketball and football for the Wildcats. He had multiple D-I offers for football, but he chose to pursue basketball because of the threat of injuries and CTE. He received basketball offers from Syracuse, Ball State, Kent State, and Oakland, and committed to play for the Oakland Golden Grizzlies and coach Greg Kampe.

== College career ==
As a freshman at Oakland, Maddox averaged 6.7 points and 2.4 rebounds per game. He had a better season as a sophomore, putting up 9.0 points, 3.0 rebounds, and 2.2 assists during the 2019–20 season. He transferred to Cal State Fullerton for his junior year.

During his first year at CSU Fullerton, he averaged 15.9 points and made Second Team All-Big West Conference in the COVID shortened season. In 2021-22 for the Titans, Maddox averaged 9.5 points, 2.6 rebounds, 1.9 assists and 1.1 steals, helping CSUF win the Big West and reach March Madness for the first time since 2018. He transferred closer to his hometown to play at Western Michigan, using his final year of eligibility to play for the Broncos.

As a senior for the Broncos, Maddox 12.5 points and 3.8 rebounds in 25 games, starting 18 at shooting guard. He put up his collegiate career high against Miami, putting up 25 versus the Hurricanes. He also put up 22 on Senior Night against Central Michigan, including 6 three-pointers.

== Professional career ==
=== Osceola Magic (2023–2024) ===
Maddox was selected with the fourth pick of the second round (34th overall) by the Osceola Magic in the 2023 NBA G-League Draft.

=== Cleveland Charge (2024) ===
On March 6, 2024, Maddox was traded to the Cleveland Charge.

On August 29, 2024, Maddox was traded to the Long Island Nets, but was waived on November 4.

=== Windsor Express (2024) ===
In December 2024, Maddox joined the Windsor Express of the Basketball Super League.
