= Denzel Mahoney =

American basketball player

Personal information
- Born: January 18, 1998 (age 28) Oviedo, Florida, U.S.
- Listed height: 6 ft 5 in (1.96 m)
- Listed weight: 220 lb (100 kg)

Career information
- High school: Paul J. Hagerty (Oviedo, Florida)
- College: Southeast Missouri State (2016–2018); Creighton (2019–2021)
- NBA draft: 2021: undrafted
- Playing career: 2021–2023
- Position: Shooting guard / small forward

Career history
- 2021–2023: Austin Spurs

Career highlights
- Big East Sixth Man of the Year (2020); First-team All-OVC (2018); Second-team All-OVC (2017); OVC Freshman of the Year (2017)
- Stats at NBA.com
- Stats at Basketball Reference

Denzel Mahoney (born January 18, 1998) is an American former professional basketball player He played college basketball for the Creighton Bluejays and the Southeast Missouri State Redhawks.

== High school career ==
Mahoney attended Paul J. Hagerty High School in Oviedo, Florida. He was named Florida 8A State Player of the Year as a junior. He suffered a torn ACL during an Amateur Athletic Union game and missed his senior season while rehabilitating. Mahoney committed to playing college basketball for Southeast Missouri State.

== College career ==
As a freshman at Southeast Missouri State, Mahoney averaged 14.9 points per game and earned Ohio Valley Conference (OVC) Freshman of the Year honors and a spot on the all-OVC second team. He followed this up by raising his scoring average to 19.3 points per game in his second season and garnered first-team All-OVC accolades. Following his sophomore season, Mahoney transferred from the Redhawks, ultimately settling on Creighton.

After transferring, Mahoney sat out the 2018–19 season per NCAA rules. He became eligible on December 17 the following season. He led all Big East Conference non-starters in scoring at 12 points per game and received the Big East Sixth Man of the Year award. Following the season, Mahoney declared for the 2020 NBA draft, but ultimately returned for his final season. As a senior, he averaged 12.5 points and 4.1 rebounds per game. Mahoney declared for the 2021 NBA draft, forgoing his final season of eligibility that was granted by the NCAA due to the COVID-19 pandemic.

== Professional career ==
=== Austin Spurs (2021–2023) ===
After going undrafted in the 2021 NBA draft, Mahoney joined the Charlotte Hornets for the 2021 NBA Summer League and on October 6, 2021, he signed with the San Antonio Spurs. However, he was cut from training camp before opening night. On October 27, he signed with the Austin Spurs as an affiliate player.

On October 28, 2023, the Iowa Wolves selected Mahoney with the 57th pick in the 2023 NBA G League draft. However, they waived him on November 8.
