= Kyree Walker =

American basketball player (born 2000)

No. 6 – Nalaikh Bison
- Position: Small forward
- League: The League

Personal information
- Born: November 20, 2000 (age 25) Atlanta, Georgia, U.S.
- Listed height: 6 ft 6 in (1.98 m)
- Listed weight: 220 lb (100 kg)

Career information
- High school: Moreau Catholic (Hayward, California); Hillcrest Prep Academy (Phoenix, Arizona)
- NBA draft: 2021: undrafted
- Playing career: 2021–present

Career history
- 2021–2022: Capital City Go-Go
- 2022–2023: Aias Evosmou
- 2023: Scarborough Shooting Stars
- 2024: IHC Apes
- 2024: Scarborough Shooting Stars
- 2024: Ottawa BlackJacks
- 2024–present: Nalaikh Bison

Career highlights
- CEBL champion (2023); The League third place (2024)

Kyree Walker (born November 20, 2000) is an American professional basketball player for the Nalaikh Bison of The League. At the high school level, he played for Moreau Catholic High School in Hayward, California before transferring to Hillcrest Prep Academy. A former MaxPreps National Freshman of the Year, Walker was a five-star recruit.

== Early life ==
In eighth grade, Walker drew national attention for his slam dunks in highlight videos. He often faced older competition, including high school seniors, in middle school with his Amateur Athletic Union (AAU) team Oakland Soldiers. As a high school freshman, Walker played basketball for Moreau Catholic High School in Hayward, California, averaging 21.3 points, 6.5 rebounds and four assists per game. After leading his team to a California Interscholastic Federation Division II runner-up finish, he was named MaxPreps National Freshman of the Year. Entering his sophomore season, Walker transferred to Hillcrest Prep, a basketball program in Phoenix, Arizona, with his father, Khari, joining the coaching staff. On October 25, 2019, during his senior year, he left Hillcrest Prep, intending to move to the college or professional level. In December 2019, Walker graduated from high school but did not play high school basketball while weighing his options.

On June 30, 2017, Walker committed to play college basketball for Arizona State over several other NCAA Division I offers. At the time, he was considered a five-star recruit and a top five player in the 2020 class by major recruiting services. On October 21, 2018, Walker decommitted from Arizona State. On April 20, 2020, as a four-star recruit, he announced that he would forego college basketball.

College recruiting
Name	Hometown	School	Height	Weight	Commit date
Kyree Walker; SF	Phoenix, AZ	Hillcrest Prep (AZ)	6 ft 5 in (1.96 m)	200 lb (91 kg)	—
Kyree Walker; SF	Recruit ratings: Rivals: 247Sports: ESPN: (81)				
Overall recruit ranking: 247Sports: 35
Note: In many cases, Scout, Rivals, 247Sports, On3, and ESPN may conflict in their listings of height and weight.; In these cases, the average was taken. ESPN grades are on a 100-point scale.; Sources: "2020 Team Ranking". Rivals.

== Professional career ==
Walker joined Chameleon BX to prepare for the 2021 NBA draft. For the 2021–22 season, he signed with the Capital City Go-Go of the NBA G League, joining the team after a successful tryout.

In December 2022, Walker joined the Aias Evosmou of the Greek A2 Basket League.

In June 2023, Walker signed with the Scarborough Shooting Stars of the Canadian Elite Basketball League.

On October 30, 2023, Walker joined the Rio Grande Valley Vipers, but was waived on November 8.

In January 2024, Walker joined the IHC Apes of The League.

In May 2024, Walker re-signed with the Scarborough Shooting Stars of the Canadian Elite Basketball League.

In June 2024, Walker signed with the Ottawa BlackJacks of the Canadian Elite Basketball League.

=== IHC Apes (2024) ===
On 2024, Walker joined IHC Apes of The League and went to semi-finals.

=== Nalaikh Bison (2024) ===
On November 27, 2024, Walker joined the Nalaikh Bison of The League. He averaged 16.6 points, 5.4 rebounds, 3.9 assists, and 1.3 steals.
