= Bryson Warren =

American basketball player (born 2004)

No. 5 – Motor City Cruise
- Position: Point guard / shooting guard
- League: NBA G League

Personal information
- Born: October 14, 2004 (age 22) North Little Rock, Arkansas, U. S.
- Listed height: 6 ft 3 in (1.91 m)
- Listed weight: 174 lb (79 kg)

Career information
- High school: Little Rock Central (Little Rock, Arkansas)
- NBA draft: 2024: undrafted
- Playing career: 2023–present

Career history
- 2021–2022: Team OTE
- 2022–2023: YNG Dreamerz
- 2023–2025: Sioux Falls Skyforce
- 2025–2026: Westchester Knicks
- 2026–present: Motor City Cruise
- Stats at NBA.com
- Stats at Basketball Reference

Bryson Warren (born October 14, 2004) is an American professional basketball player for the Motor City Cruise of the NBA G League. He decided to forego college basketball as a highly touted prospect, and instead played in the Overtime Elite.

== High school career ==
Warren attended Little Rock Central High School in Little Rock, Arkansas, where he averaged 24.1 points, 3.7 assists, 3.5 rebounds and 2.5 steals per game, while shooting 44% from three. He was named the Arkansas Basketball Coaches Association High School Player of the Year. He later transferred to Link Academy in Branson, Missouri, but didn't play for them, opting instead to go pro and play at the Overtime Elite.

== College career ==
On April 22, 2026, it was announced that Warren would be signing to play for Texas A&M. On August 26, Warren was granted a temporary restraining order (TRO) against the NCAA by a judge in Brazos County, Texas, declaring him eligible for the 2026–27 season. However, the day before the Southeastern Conference ruled him ineligible to play for Texas A&M under its new conference specific rules regarding NBA draft declarations and signed contracts. As a result, Warren entered the NCAA transfer portal ahead of his next TRO court hearing on September 4.

== Professional career ==
=== Team OTE (2021–2022) ===
On September 21, 2021, Warren signed with Team OTE of the Overtime Elite. In his first season, he was one of the team's best scorers, scoring in double figures 18 times and was sixth in the league in three-point percentage, while hitting the league's first-ever game winner in opening night. He eventually helped his team to win a league championship.

=== YNG Dreamerz (2022–2023) ===
In his second season, Warren joined the YNG Dreamerz of Overtime Elite, where he averaged 14.3 points, 5.1 rebounds and 4.6 assists per game in the regular season and was voted Second Team All-OTE. He scored in double figures in 12 games during the season and scored over 20 points three times and in the playoffs, he averaged 14.0 points and 5.2 rebounds leading the team to the Championship game, which they ended up losing to the City Reapers.

=== Sioux Falls Skyforce (2023–2025) ===
On October 30, 2023, Warren joined the Sioux Falls Skyforce of the NBA G League after being drafted in the G League draft. He played 27 games and averaged 6.9 points, 1.5 rebounds, 1.8 assists, 0.6 steals and 0.3 blocks in 17.4 minutes. After season's end, he declared for the 2024 NBA draft, but went unselected.

After joining them for the 2024 NBA Summer League, Warren signed with the Miami Heat on September 11, 2024, but was waived the next day. On October 28, he rejoined the Skyforce.
