= 1932–33 NCAA men's basketball season =

Men's collegiate basketball season

- Helms National Champions: Kentucky (retroactive selection in 1943)
- Player of the Year (Helms): Forest Sale, Kentucky (retroactive selection in 1944)

The 1932–33 NCAA men's basketball season began in December 1932, progressed through the regular season and conference tournaments, and concluded in March 1933.

== Rule changes ==
- To reduce stalling, a mid-court line is introduced: After crossing it, a team on offense was not permitted to move the ball back across the line. Previously, teams on offense could use the entire court to spread the defense thin, and often played keep-away without trying to score, leading to dull, low-scoring games.
- A player with the ball was prohibited from standing in the free-throw lane (also known as the "key") for more than three seconds.
- The number of referees increased from one to two.

== Season headlines ==
- The Eastern Intercollegiate Conference began play, with five original members.
- The Southeastern Conference began play, with 13 original members.
- In February 1943, the Helms Athletic Foundation retroactively selected Kentucky as its national champion for the 1932–33 season.
- In 1995, the Premo-Porretta Power Poll retroactively selected Texas as its top-ranked team for the 1932–33 season.

== Conference membership changes ==
School	Former conference	New conference
Alabama Crimson Tide	Southern Conference	Southeastern Conference
Auburn Tigers	Southern Conference	Southeastern Conference
Butler Bulldogs	Independent	Missouri Valley Conference
Carnegie Tech Tartans	Independent	Eastern Intercollegiate Conference
Florida Gators	Southern Conference	Southeastern Conference
Georgia Bulldogs	Southern Conference	Southeastern Conference
Georgia Tech Yellow Jackets	Southern Conference	Southeastern Conference
Georgetown Hoyas	Independent	Eastern Intercollegiate Conference
Kentucky Wildcats	Southern Conference	Southeastern Conference
LSU Tigers	Southern Conference	Southeastern Conference
Mississippi Rebels	Southern Conference	Southeastern Conference
Mississippi State Bulldogs	Southern Conference	Southeastern Conference
Pittsburgh Panthers	Independent	Eastern Intercollegiate Conference
Sewanee Tigers	Southern Conference	Southeastern Conference
Temple Owls	Independent	Eastern Intercollegiate Conference
Tennessee Volunteers	Southern Conference	Southeastern Conference
Texas Tech Matadors	Independent	Border Conference
Tulane Green Wave	Southern Conference	Southeastern Conference
Vanderbilt Commodores	Southern Conference	Southeastern Conference
West Virginia Mountaineers	Independent	Eastern Intercollegiate Conference

== Regular season ==
=== Conferences ===
==== Conference winners and tournaments ====
Conference	Regular season winner	Conference player of the year	Conference tournament	Tournament venue (City)	Tournament winner
Big Six Conference	Kansas	None selected	No Tournament		
Big Ten Conference	Northwestern & Ohio State	None selected	No Tournament		
Border Conference	Texas Tech	None selected	No Tournament		
Eastern Intercollegiate Basketball League	Yale	None selected	No Tournament		
Eastern Intercollegiate Conference	Pittsburgh	None selected	No Tournament		
Missouri Valley Conference	Butler	None selected	No Tournament		
Pacific Coast Conference	Oregon State (North); USC (South)		No Tournament; Oregon State defeated USC in best-of-three conference championship playoff series		
Rocky Mountain Athletic Conference	Colorado Agricultural & Wyoming (Eastern); BYU & Utah (Western)		No Tournament		
Southeastern Conference	Kentucky	None selected	1933 SEC men's basketball tournament	Atlanta Athletic Club (Atlanta, Georgia)	Kentucky
Southern Conference	South Carolina	None selected	1933 Southern Conference men's basketball tournament	Thompson Gym (Raleigh, North Carolina)	South Carolina
Southwest Conference	Texas	None selected	No Tournament		

==== Conference standings ====
1932–33 Big Six Conference men's basketball standings
	Conf.				Overall
Team	W		L	PCT	W		L	PCT
Kansas	8	–	2	.800	13	–	4	.765
Oklahoma	7	–	3	.700	12	–	5	.706
Missouri	6	–	4	.600	10	–	8	.556
Kansas State	4	–	6	.400	9	–	9	.500
Nebraska	3	–	7	.300	3	–	13	.188
Iowa State	2	–	8	.200	6	–	10	.375

1932–33 Big Ten Conference men's basketball standings
	Conf.				Overall
Team	W		L	PCT	W		L	PCT
Ohio State	10	–	2	.833	17	–	3	.850
Northwestern	10	–	2	.833	15	–	4	.789
Iowa	8	–	4	.667	15	–	5	.750
Michigan	8	–	4	.667	10	–	8	.556
Illinois	6	–	6	.500	11	–	7	.611
Purdue	6	–	6	.500	11	–	7	.611
Indiana	6	–	6	.500	10	–	8	.556
Wisconsin	4	–	8	.333	7	–	13	.350
Minnesota	1	–	11	.083	5	–	15	.250
Chicago	1	–	11	.083	2	–	16	.111

1932–33 Border Conference men's basketball standings
	Conf.				Overall
Team	W		L	PCT	W		L	PCT
Texas Tech	4	–	0	1.000	13	–	9	.591
Arizona	7	–	3	.700	19	–	5	.792
Arizona State Teachers–Flagstaff	7	–	5	.583	9	–	5	.643
New Mexico	8	–	6	.571	13	–	6	.684
Arizona State Teachers	7	–	9	.438	13	–	12	.520
New Mexico A&M	2	–	10	.167	7	–	11	.389

1932–33 Eastern Intercollegiate Basketball League standings
	Conf.				Overall
Team	W		L	PCT	W		L	PCT
Yale	8	–	2	.800	19	–	3	.864
Princeton	7	–	3	.700	19	–	3	.864
Penn	6	–	4	.600	12	–	6	.667
Dartmouth	5	–	5	.500	12	–	6	.667
Columbia	3	–	7	.300	7	–	10	.412
Cornell	1	–	9	.100	6	–	11	.353

1932–33 Eastern Intercollegiate Conference men's basketball standings
	Conf.				Overall
Team	W		L	PCT	W		L	PCT
Pittsburgh	7	–	1	.875	17	–	5	.773
Temple	5	–	3	.625	15	–	6	.714
Carnegie Tech	4	–	4	.500	4	–	5	.444
Georgetown	3	–	5	.375	6	–	11	.353
West Virginia	1	–	7	.125	10	–	14	.417

1932–33 Missouri Valley Conference men's basketball standings
	Conf.				Overall
Team	W		L	PCT	W		L	PCT
Butler	9	–	1	.900	16	–	5	.762
Creighton	8	–	2	.800	12	–	5	.706
Washington University	5	–	5	.500	11	–	6	.647
Grinnell	3	–	7	.300	5	–	11	.313
Oklahoma A&M	3	–	7	.300	5	–	12	.294
Drake	2	–	8	.200	4	–	12	.250

1932–33 Pacific Coast Conference men's basketball standings
	Conf.				Overall
Team	W		L	PCT	W		L	PCT
North
Oregon State †	12	–	4	.750	21	–	6	.778
Washington	10	–	6	.625	22	–	6	.786
Washington State	8	–	8	.500	17	–	8	.680
Idaho	8	–	8	.500	20	–	9	.690
Oregon	2	–	14	.125	8	–	19	.296
South
USC	10	–	1	.909	18	–	5	.783
California	8	–	3	.727	18	–	7	.720
Stanford	3	–	8	.273	9	–	18	.333
UCLA	1	–	10	.091	10	–	11	.476
† Conference playoff series winner

1932–33 Rocky Mountain Athletic Conference men's basketball standings
	Conf.				Overall
Team	W		L	PCT	W		L	PCT
Eastern
Wyoming†	12	–	2	.857	18	–	5	.783
Northern Colorado	12	–	2	.857	13	–	7	.650
Colorado Agricultural†	7	–	5	.583	7	–	5	.583
Western State	6	–	6	.500	8	–	6	.571
Colorado College	6	–	8	.429	7	–	12	.368
Denver	4	–	10	.286	7	–	12	.368
Colorado Mines	0	–	14	.000	0	–	14	.000
Western
BYU†	9	–	3	.750	20	–	7	.741
Utah†	9	–	3	.750	13	–	8	.619
Utah State	4	–	8	.333	10	–	12	.455
Colorado	7	–	7	.500	8	–	8	.500
Montana State	2	–	10	.167	9	–	18	.333
† Respective division co-championship winner

1932–33 Southeastern Conference men's basketball standings
	Conf.				Overall
Team	W		L	PCT	W		L	PCT
Kentucky †	8	–	0	1.000	21	–	3	.875
Alabama	12	–	3	.800	14	–	5	.737
Vanderbilt	11	–	5	.688	14	–	8	.636
LSU	13	–	7	.650	15	–	8	.652
Georgia Tech	7	–	5	.583	9	–	6	.600
Florida	4	–	4	.500	9	–	5	.643
Georgia	5	–	6	.455	9	–	10	.474
Ole Miss	5	–	7	.417	6	–	12	.333
Auburn	4	–	7	.364	4	–	9	.308
Tulane	6	–	14	.300	8	–	15	.348
Tennessee	3	–	7	.300	9	–	11	.450
Mississippi State	3	–	9	.250	6	–	13	.316
Sewanee	0	–	7	.000	1	–	10	.091
† 1933 SEC Tournament winner

1932–33 Southern Conference men's basketball standings
	Conf.				Overall
Team	W		L	PCT	W		L	PCT
South Carolina †	4	–	0	1.000	17	–	2	.895
Duke	7	–	3	.700	17	–	5	.773
Maryland	7	–	3	.700	11	–	9	.550
NC State	6	–	3	.667	11	–	8	.579
North Carolina	5	–	3	.625	12	–	5	.706
Virginia	5	–	3	.625	12	–	6	.667
Virginia Tech	3	–	7	.300	5	–	10	.333
VMI	2	–	8	.200	5	–	10	.333
Washington and Lee	1	–	8	.111	6	–	10	.375
Clemson	0	–	2	.000	10	–	9	.526
† Southern Conference Tournament winner

1932–33 Southwest Conference men's basketball standings
	Conf.				Overall
Team	W		L	PCT	W		L	PCT
Texas	11	–	1	.917	22	–	1	.957
TCU	9	–	3	.750	16	–	4	.800
Texas A&M	8	–	4	.667	9	–	10	.474
Arkansas	6	–	6	.500	14	–	7	.667
SMU	5	–	7	.417	9	–	9	.500
Rice	2	–	10	.167	8	–	10	.444
Baylor	1	–	11	.083	4	–	13	.235

=== Major independents ===
A total of 74 college teams played as major independents. Duquesne (15–1) had the best winning percentage (.938), and St. John's (23–4) finished with the most wins.

1932–33 NCAA men's basketball independents standings
	Conf.				Overall
Team	W		L	PCT	W		L	PCT
Duquesne		–		–	15	–	1	.938
Carleton		–		–	14	–	1	.933
CCNY		–		–	13	–	1	.929
Michigan State Normal		–		–	15	–	2	.882
Navy		–		–	14	–	2	.875
Syracuse		–		–	14	–	2	.875
Valparaiso		–		–	14	–	2	.875
Wichita Municipal		–		–	14	–	2	.875
St. John's (N.Y.)		–		–	23	–	4	.852
West Texas State		–		–	20	–	4	.833
Marquette		–		–	14	–	3	.824
Western State Teachers		–		–	14	–	3	.824
La Salle		–		–	13	–	3	.813
Providence		–		–	13	–	3	.813
DePaul		–		–	12	–	3	.800
Ohio		–		–	16	–	4	.800
Rhode Island State		–		–	14	–	4	.778
Westminster (Pa.)		–		–	19	–	6	.760
George Washington		–		–	15	–	5	.750
New York University		–		–	11	–	4	.733
Notre Dame		–		–	16	–	6	.727
Western Kentucky State		–		–	16	–	6	.727
William & Mary		–		–	13	–	5	.722
Detroit		–		–	12	–	5	.706
St. Bonaventure		–		–	7	–	3	.700
Villanova		–		–	9	–	4	.692
Niagara		–		–	13	–	6	.684
Loyola (Ill.)		–		–	14	–	7	.667
Richmond		–		–	8	–	4	.667
Seton Hall		–		–	8	–	4	.667
Tulsa		–		–	11	–	6	.647
Bowling Green State		–		–	9	–	5	.643
Penn State		–		–	7	–	4	.636
Indiana State		–		–	10	–	6	.625
Xavier		–		–	5	–	3	.625
Bradley		–		–	8	–	5	.615
Michigan State		–		–	10	–	7	.588
San Francisco		–		–	10	–	7	.588
Furman		–		–	11	–	8	.579
Manhattan		–		–	11	–	8	.579
Rutgers		–		–	8	–	6	.571
Saint Francis (N.Y.)		–		–	12	–	9	.571
Washburn		–		–	8	–	6	.571
Lehigh		–		–	9	–	7	.563
Boston University		–		–	8	–	7	.533
Springfield (Mass.)		–		–	9	–	8	.529
Marshall		–		–	10	–	9	.526
Army		–		–	5	–	5	.500
Cincinnati		–		–	9	–	9	.500
Dayton		–		–	7	–	7	.500
Louisville		–		–	11	–	11	.500
Saint Louis		–		–	9	–	9	.500
Loyola (Md.)		–		–	8	–	9	.471
Saint Mary's (Calif.)		–		–	10	–	12	.455
Muhlenberg		–		–	9	–	11	.450
Santa Clara		–		–	8	–	10	.444
St. Joseph's		–		–	7	–	9	.438
Bucknell		–		–	6	–	8	.429
Montana		–		–	8	–	11	.421
Brown		–		–	6	–	9	.400
Canisius		–		–	6	–	9	.400
Fordham		–		–	7	–	11	.389
Wake Forest		–		–	5	–	8	.385
LIU		–		–	6	–	11	.353
Colgate		–		–	5	–	10	.333
The Citadel		–		–	4	–	11	.267
Kent State		–		–	4	–	11	.267
Connecticut		–		–	4	–	12	.250
Davidson		–		–	4	–	14	.222
Miami (Ohio)		–		–	3	–	13	.188
Toledo		–		–	3	–	13	.188
Harvard		–		–	2	–	10	.167
Lafayette		–		–	2	–	10	.167
Texas State M&M		–		–	1	–	9	.100

== Awards ==
=== Consensus All-American team ===
Consensus Team
Player	Class	Team
Moose Krause	Junior	Notre Dame
Elliott Loughlin	Senior	Navy
Jerry Nemer	Senior	USC
Joe Reiff	Senior	Northwestern
Forest Sale	Senior	Kentucky
Don Smith	Senior	Pittsburgh

=== Major player of the year awards ===
- Helms Player of the Year: Forest Sale, Kentucky (retroactive selection in 1944)

== Coaching changes ==
A number of teams changed coaches during the season and after it ended.

Team	Former Coach	Interim Coach	New Coach	Reason
Arizona State Teachers	Ted Shipkey		Rudy Lavik	
Arkansas	Charles Bassett		Glen Rose	
Auburn	Sam J. McAllister		Ralph Jordan	
Canisius	Russell Burt		Allie Sheelbach	
Cincinnati	John Halliday		Tay Brown	
The Citadel	Johnny Douglas		Charlie Willard	
Colorado	Howard Beresford		Henry Iba	
Columbia	Daniel Meenan		Paul Mooney	
Dayton	Bill Belanich		Louis Tschudi	
Florida	Brady Cowell		Ben Clemons	
Furman	Dizzy McLeod		Flucie Stewart	
Harvard	Ed Wachter		Wes Fesler	
Indiana State	David Glascock		Wally Marks	
Kansas State	Charlie Corsaut		Frank Root	
Kent State	Merle E. Wagoner		Gus Peterka	
Mississippi State	Ray G. Dauber		Edwin Hale	
New Mexico	Tom Churchill		Roy W. Johnson	
Richmond	Frank Dobson		Malcolm Pitt	
South Carolina	Billy Laval		Rock Norman	
Tulane	George E. Rody		Ray G. Dauber	
Wake Forest	Fred Emmerson		Murray Greason	
West Virginia	Francis Stadsvold		Marshall Glenn	
Xavier	Joseph A. Meyer		Clem Crowe	
