= List of Georgia Tech Yellow Jackets men's basketball head coaches =

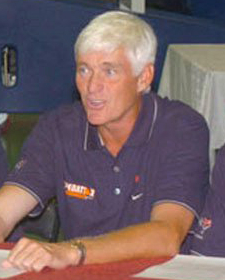
Bobby Cremins, the winningest head coach in Yellow Jackets men's basketball history.

The following is a list of Georgia Tech Yellow Jackets men's basketball head coaches. There have been 15 head coaches of the Yellow Jackets in their 108-season history.

Georgia Tech's current head coach is Scott Cross. He was hired in March 2026, replacing Damon Stoudamire, who was fired after the 2025–26 season.

No.	Tenure	Coach	Years	Record	Pct.
1	1905–1906	John Chapman	1	2–1	.667
2	1908–1914 (Note: Georgia Tech did not field a team from 1909 to 1912.)	John Heisman	3	9–14	.391
3	1919–1920; 1921–1924	William Alexander	4	36–38	.486
4	1920–1921	Joe Bean	1	4–10	.286
5	1924–1926	Harold Hansen	2	10–23	.303
6	1926–1943	Roy Mundorff	17	172–134	.562
7	1943–1946	Dwight Keith	3	35–21	.625
8	1946–1951	Roy McArthur	5	57–72	.442
9	1951–1973	John Hyder	22	292–271	.519
10	1973–1981	Dwane Morrison	8	91–122	.427
11	1981–2000	Bobby Cremins	19	354–237	.599
12	2000–2011	Paul Hewitt	11	190–162	.540
13	2011–2016	Brian Gregory	5	76–86	.469
14	2016–2023 (Note: Georgia Tech vacated 23 games from the 2016–17 and 2017–18 seasons. Pastner's on-court record is 109–114 (.489).)	Josh Pastner	7	87–112	.437
15	2023–2026	Damon Stoudamire	3	42–55	.433
16	2026–present	Scott Cross		–	–
Totals		15 coaches	110 seasons	1,457–1,358	.518
Records updated through end of 2025–26 season Source
