= A. Burnet Stoney =

American football and basketball coach (1892–1973)

Biographical details
- Born: December 15, 1892; Camden, South Carolina, U.S.
- Died: April 28, 1973 (aged 80); Morganton, North Carolina, U.S.
- Education: Harvard Law School

Playing career

Football
- 1912–1914: South Carolina
- Position: Tackle

Coaching career (HC unless noted)

Football
- 1922–1923: Apprentice

Basketball
- 1927–1928: South Carolina

Head coaching record
- Overall: 14–3 (football); 8–12 (basketball)

Accomplishments and honors

Awards
- All-Southern (1914)

Andrew Burnet Stoney (December 15, 1892 – April 28, 1973) was an American football coach. Stoney was the second head football coach at The Apprentice School in Newport News, Virginia and he held that position for two seasons, from 1922 until 1923. His coaching record at Apprentice was 14–3.

Stoney later coached at the University of South Carolina, his alma mater. He also coached their basketball team in 1928.

The son of James Moss and Jane Johnston (Shannon) Stoney, Stoney later served in the North Carolina House of Representatives as a representative from Burke County, first being elected in 1941. He died on April 28, 1973.
