= Dwane Morrison =

American basketball player and coach

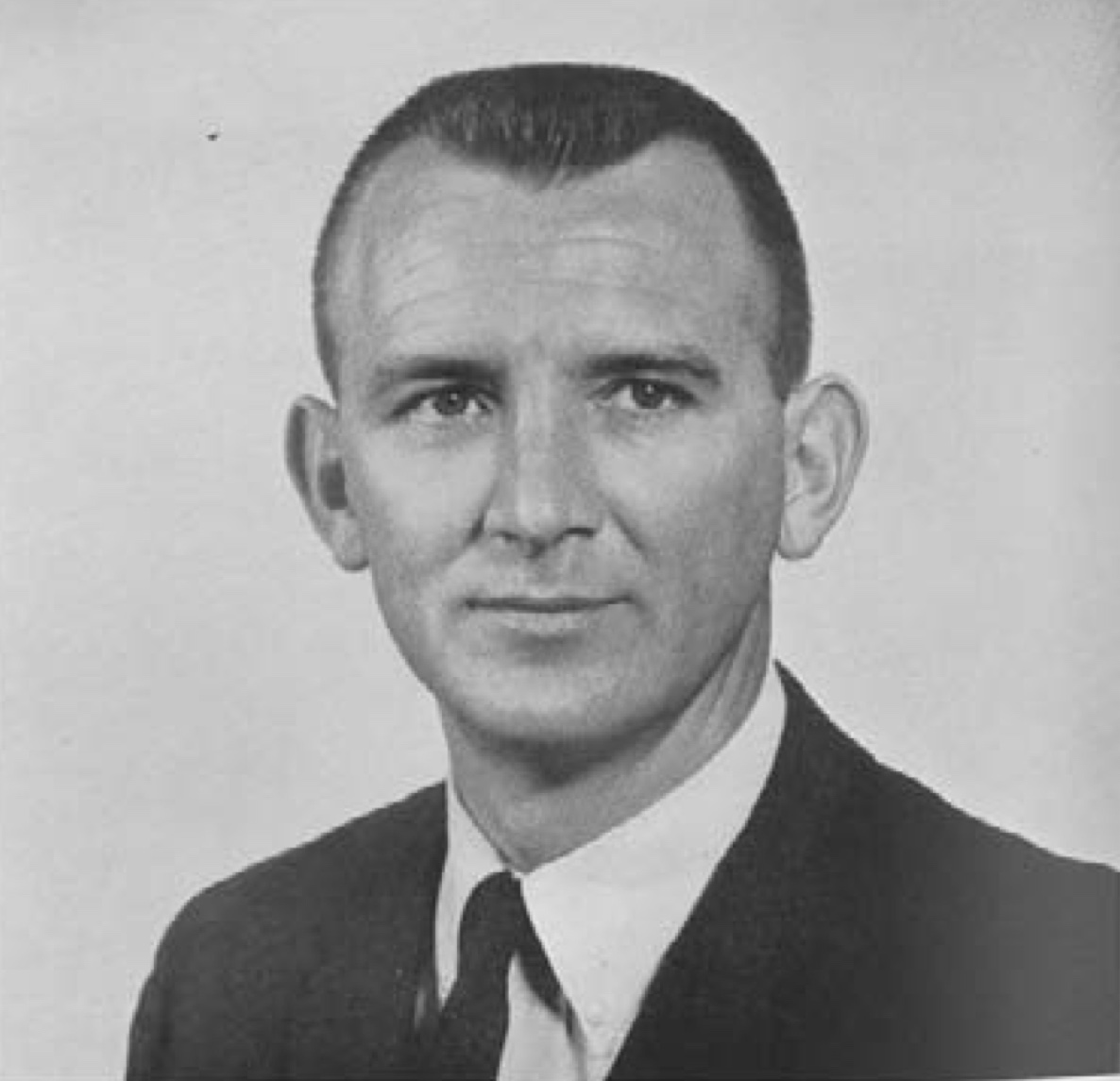
- Morrison from the 1964 Garnet & Black.

Biographical details
- Born: Owensboro, Kentucky, U.S.

Playing career
- 1948–1950: Campbellsville
- 1950–1952: South Carolina

Coaching career (HC unless noted)
- 1963–1964: South Carolina (assistant)
- 1964: South Carolina
- 1964–1970: Georgia Tech (assistant)
- 1970–1973: Mercer
- 1973–1981: Georgia Tech

Head coaching record
- Overall: 143–152

Accomplishments and honors

Awards
- Metro Conference Coach of the Year (1977)

Dwane Morrison is a retired American college basketball player and coach. He is best known as the coach of the Georgia Tech Yellow Jackets from 1973 to 1981. He is also the son of former Major League pitcher Johnny "Jughandle" Morrison.

== College ==
Morrison, a 6'3 guard from Owensboro, Kentucky, played basketball for two years at Campbellsville Junior College (now Campbellsville University) before transferring to the University of South Carolina. In his senior year of 1951–52, Morrison led the Gamecocks with a 19.8 scoring average and was selected second team All-Southern Conference.

== Coach ==
=== South Carolina ===
After his playing days ended, Morrison turned to coaching. After coaching high school basketball for several years, he landed at his alma mater, South Carolina, as freshman coach and assistant to head coach Chuck Noe in 1963. His college coaching career accelerated when Noe resigned due to exhaustion midway through the season. Morrison was named interim head coach for the last 12 games of the season, leading the Gamecocks to a 4–8 record down the stretch. After the season, South Carolina hired future Hall of Fame coach Frank McGuire, ending Morrison's tenure as head coach of the Gamecocks.

=== Georgia Tech ===
Morrison landed at Georgia Tech as an assistant to John "Whack" Hyder. He spent 6 years with the Yellow Jackets before getting his next shot as a head coach at Mercer University. After a successful three-year stint at Mercer (48–22), Morrison had the opportunity to succeed his former mentor Hyder as head coach at Georgia Tech. Morrison led the Yellow Jackets for eight years from 1973 to 1981, a period which saw the school move from Independent status to the new Metro Conference, back to independent status and finally led their transition to the Atlantic Coast Conference. Unfortunately, Morrison's two years in the ACC were not successful, as his teams went 1–27 in league play over the two-year span. The bottom fell out in 1980–81, when Morrison's Jackets tallied the worst record in school history at 4–23, including a winless record in ACC play. Morrison was fired and replaced by Bobby Cremins. His overall record at Georgia Tech was 91–122.

== Head coaching record ==
Record table
Season	Team	Overall	Conference	Standing	Postseason
South Carolina Gamecocks (Atlantic Coast Conference) (1963–1964)
1963–64	South Carolina	4–8	4–6	4th	
South Carolina:		4–8	4–6		
Mercer Bears (NCAA College Division independent) (1970–1973)
1970–71	Mercer	14–9			
1971–72	Mercer	19–7			NCAA College Division Regional semifinal
1972–73	Mercer	15–6			
Mercer:		48–22			
Georgia Tech Yellow Jackets (NCAA University Division / Division I independent) (1973–1975)
1973–74	Georgia Tech	5–21			
1974–75	Georgia Tech	11–15			
Georgia Tech:		16–36			
Georgia Tech Yellow Jackets (Metro Conference) (1975–1978)
1975–76	Georgia Tech	13–14	0–1	5th	
1976–77	Georgia Tech	18–10	3–3	T–3rd	
1977–78	Georgia Tech	15–12	6–6	T–4th	
Georgia Tech Yellow Jackets (NCAA Division I independent) (1978–1979)
1978–79	Georgia Tech	17–9			
Georgia Tech Yellow Jackets (Atlantic Coast Conference) (1979–1981)
1979–80	Georgia Tech	8–18	1–13	8th	
1980–81	Georgia Tech	4–23	0–14	8th	
Georgia Tech:		91–122	10–37		
Total:		143–152			
