= 1932–33 Georgia Bulldogs basketball team =

American college basketball team season

1932–33 Georgia Bulldogs basketball
- Conference: Southeastern Conference
- Record: 9–10 (5–6 SEC)
- Head coach: Rex Enright (2nd season)
- Captain: Leroy Young
- Home arena: Woodruff Hall

1932–33 Southeastern Conference men's basketball standings
	Conf.				Overall
Team	W		L	PCT	W		L	PCT
Kentucky †	8	–	0	1.000	21	–	3	.875
Alabama	12	–	3	.800	14	–	5	.737
Vanderbilt	11	–	5	.688	14	–	8	.636
LSU	13	–	7	.650	15	–	8	.652
Georgia Tech	7	–	5	.583	9	–	6	.600
Florida	4	–	4	.500	9	–	5	.643
Georgia	5	–	6	.455	9	–	10	.474
Ole Miss	5	–	7	.417	6	–	12	.333
Auburn	4	–	7	.364	4	–	9	.308
Tulane	6	–	14	.300	8	–	15	.348
Tennessee	3	–	7	.300	9	–	11	.450
Mississippi State	3	–	9	.250	6	–	13	.316
Sewanee	0	–	7	.000	1	–	10	.091
† 1933 SEC Tournament winner

The 1932–33 Georgia Bulldogs basketball team represented the University of Georgia as a member of the newly-formed Southeastern Conference (SEC) during the 1932–33 NCAA men's basketball season. Led by second-year head coach Rex Enright, the Bulldogs compiled an overall record of 9–10 with a mark of 5–6 in conference play, placing seventh in the SEC. The team captain was Leroy Young.

== Roster ==
1932–33 Georgia Bulldogs men's basketball team
Players
Coaches

Pos.	#	Name	Height	Weight	Year	Previous school	Hometown
		Virylyn Moore	—	—
		Billups Johnson	—	—
		Stokely Pound	—	—
		Lee Webb	—	—
		R.L. O'Kelley	—	—
		William Maddox	—	—
		Brown Wilder	—	—
		Flip Costa	—	—
		Paul Ludwig	—	—

Head coach

Rex Enright

Assistant coach(es)

Legend

- (C) Team captain
- (S) Suspended
- (I) Ineligible
- (W) Walk-on
- Injured
- Current redshirt

== Schedule ==
Date time, TV	Opponent	Result	Record	Site city, state
12/27/1932	at Tulane	W 28-20	1–0	
12/28/1932	at Tulane	W 41-39	2–0	
1/11/1933	Florida	W 37-34	3–0	
1/12/1933	Florida	L 32-33	3–1	
1/14/1933	Ga.Tech	W 30-25	4–1	
1/20/1933	at Florida	L 22-25	4–2	
1/21/1933	at Florida	L 39-40	4–3	
1/23/1933	at Mercer	L 34-40	4–4	
1/24/1933	at Mercer	W 40-38	5–4	
1/28/1933	at Ga. Tech	L 16-26	5–5	
1/31/1933	Alabama	L 23-33	5–6	
2/4/1933	at Maryland	W 40-36	6–6	
2/6/1933	at William & Mary	W 33-32	7–6	
2/7/1933	at Virginia	W 31-17	8–6	
2/11/1933	Auburn	W 22-21	9–6	
2/14/1933	Clemson	L 25-35	9–7	
2/16/1933	at Clemson	L 29-36	9–8	
2/18/1933	Ga.Tech	L 30-32	9–9	
2/24/1933	Tulane	L 22-46	9–10	
*Non-conference game. (#) Tournament seedings in parentheses.
