= 1932–33 Kansas Jayhawks men's basketball team =

American college basketball season

1932–33 Kansas Jayhawks men's basketball

Big Six Champions
- Conference: Big Six Conference
- Record: 13–4 (8–2 Big 6)
- Head coach: Phog Allen (16th season)
- Captain: William Johnson
- Home arena: Hoch Auditorium

1932–33 Big Six Conference men's basketball standings
	Conf.				Overall
Team	W		L	PCT	W		L	PCT
Kansas	8	–	2	.800	13	–	4	.765
Oklahoma	7	–	3	.700	12	–	5	.706
Missouri	6	–	4	.600	10	–	8	.556
Kansas State	4	–	6	.400	9	–	9	.500
Nebraska	3	–	7	.300	3	–	13	.188
Iowa State	2	–	8	.200	6	–	10	.375

The 1932–33 Kansas Jayhawks men's basketball team represented the University of Kansas during the 1932–33 college men's basketball season.

== Roster ==
- Theodore O'Leary
- Leland Page
- William Johnson
- Ernest Vanek
- Elmer Schaake
- Paul Randall Harrington
- Carl Benn
- Lawrence Filkin
- Roy Klaas
- Raymond Urie
- Gordon Gray
- Dick Wells

== Schedule ==
Date time, TV	Rank^{#}	Opponent^{#}	Result	Record	Site city, state
December 2		Kansas State; Sunflower Showdown	L 27–31	0-1	Hoch Auditorium; Lawrence, KS
December 7		at Kansas State; Sunflower Showdown	L 11–15	0-2	Nichols Hall; Manhattan, KS
December 10*		at Ottawa	W 35–27	1-2	Wilson Field House; Ottawa, KS
December 15*		Ottawa	W 43–23	2-2	Hoch Auditorium; Lawrence, KS
December 30*		Stanford	W 38–20	3-2	Hoch Auditorium; Lawrence, KS
December 31*		Stanford	W 38–17	4-2	Hoch Auditorium; Lawrence, KS
January 2*		Stanford	W 34–28	5-2	Hoch Auditorium; Lawrence, KS
January 6		Nebraska	W 32–29	6-2 (1-0)	Hoch Auditorium; Lawrence, KS
January 10		Kansas State; Sunflower Showdown	W 36–24	7-2 (2-0)	Hoch Auditorium; Lawrence, KS
January 14		at Oklahoma	L 23–25	7-3 (2-1)	Field House; Norman, OK
January 19		Missouri; Border War	W 35–27	8-3 (3-1)	Hoch Auditorium; Lawrence, KS
January 24		at Iowa State	W 35–20	9-3 (4-1)	State Gymnasium; Ames, IA
February 3		at Nebraska	W 34–20	10-3 (5-1)	Nebraska Coliseum; Lincoln, NE
February 11		at Missouri; Border War	L 17–21	10-4 (5-2)	Brewer Fieldhouse; Columbia, MO
February 18		Iowa State	W 33–19	11-4 (6-2)	Hoch Auditorium; Lawrence, KS
February 25		at Kansas State; Sunflower Showdown	W 33–25	12-4 (7-2)	Nichols Hall; Manhattan, KS
March 3		Oklahoma	W 35–26	13-4 (8-2)	Hoch Auditorium; Lawrence, KS
*Non-conference game. ^{#}Rankings from AP Poll. (#) Tournament seedings in parentheses.
