= 1932–33 Cincinnati Bearcats men's basketball team =

American college basketball season

1932–33 Cincinnati Bearcats men's basketball
- Conference: Buckeye Athletic Association
- Record: 9–9 (4–6 BAA)
- Head coach: John Halliday (1st season)
- Home arena: Schmidlapp Gymnasium

The 1932–33 Cincinnati Bearcats men's basketball team represented the University of Cincinnati during the 1932–33 NCAA men's basketball season. The head coach was John Halliday, coaching his first season with the Bearcats. The team finished with an overall record of 9–9.

== Schedule ==
Date time, TV	Opponent	Result	Record	Site city, state
December 9	at Indiana	L 12–41	0–1	The Fieldhouse; Bloomington, IN
December 10	Georgetown (KY)	W 35–29	1–1	Schmidlapp Gymnasium; Cincinnati, OH
December 14	Dayton	W 39–34	2–1	Schmidlapp Gymnasium; Cincinnati, OH
December 17	DePauw	L 15–34	2–2	Schmidlapp Gymnasium; Cincinnati, OH
December 30	at Wilmington	W 35–29	3–2	Wilmington, OH
December 31	Alumni	L 37–39	3–3	Schmidlapp Gymnasium; Cincinnati, OH
January 7	Wittenberg	W 28–26	4–3	Schmidlapp Gymnasium; Cincinnati, OH
January 14	at Ohio Wesleyan	L 30–47	4–4	Delaware, OH
January 18	at Marshall	L 27–41	4–5	Huntington, WV
January 21	Ohio	L 28–32 ^{OT}	4–6	Schmidlapp Gymnasium; Cincinnati, OH
February 1	KY. Wesleyan	W 58–36	5–6	Schmidlapp Gymnasium; Cincinnati, OH
February 4	at Miami (OH)	W 40–26	6–6	Oxford, OH
February 7	at DePauw	W 16–15	7–6	Greencastle, IN
February 11	at Wittenberg	L 26–39	7–7	Springfield, OH
February 14	Ohio Wesleyan	L 31–39	7–8	Schmidlapp Gymnasium; Cincinnati, OH
February 17	Marshall	W 31–28	8–8	Schmidlapp Gymnasium; Cincinnati, OH
February 22	at Ohio	L 19–31	8–9	Men's Gymnasium; Athens, OH
February 25	Miami (OH)	W 35–29	9–9	Schmidlapp Gymnasium; Cincinnati, OH
*Non-conference game. (#) Tournament seedings in parentheses.
