= 1932–33 Duke Blue Devils men's basketball team =

American college basketball season

1932–33 Duke Blue Devils men's basketball
- Conference: Southern Conference
- Record: 17–5 (7–3 Southern)
- Head coach: Eddie Cameron
- Home arena: Card Gymnasium

1932–33 Southern Conference men's basketball standings
	Conf.				Overall
Team	W		L	PCT	W		L	PCT
South Carolina †	4	–	0	1.000	17	–	2	.895
Duke	7	–	3	.700	17	–	5	.773
Maryland	7	–	3	.700	11	–	9	.550
North Carolina State	6	–	3	.667	11	–	8	.579
North Carolina	5	–	3	.625	12	–	5	.706
Virginia	5	–	3	.625	12	–	6	.667
Virginia Tech	3	–	7	.300	5	–	10	.333
VMI	2	–	8	.200	5	–	10	.333
Washington and Lee	1	–	8	.111	6	–	10	.375
Clemson	0	–	2	.000	10	–	9	.526
† Southern Conference Tournament winner

The 1932–33 Duke Blue Devils men's basketball team represented Duke University during the 1932–33 men's college basketball season. The head coach was Eddie Cameron, coaching his fifth season with the Blue Devils. The team finished with an overall record of 17–5.
