= Buddy Blair =

American baseball player (1910-1996)

- Third baseman
- Born: September 10, 1910; Columbia, Mississippi, U.S.
- Died: June 7, 1996 (aged 85); Monroe, Louisiana, U.S.
- Batted: Left Threw: Right

MLB debut
- April 14, 1942, for the Philadelphia Athletics

Last MLB appearance
- September 20, 1942, for the Philadelphia Athletics
- Stats at Baseball Reference

Teams
- Philadelphia Athletics (1942)

Louis Nathan Blair (September 10, 1910 – June 7, 1996) was an American Major League Baseball infielder. He played for the Philadelphia Athletics during the 1942 season. In 137 games, he posted a .279 batting average (135-for-484) with 5 home runs and 66 RBI.

In college, Blair was named to the All-Tournament Second Team in the first SEC Men's Basketball Tournament in 1933. He was a forward for Louisiana State University which made it to the semifinals of the tournament. He played on the 1935 team that won the American Legion Bowl in Atlantic City and so claimed the National Championship. They beat the Pitt Panthers 41–37.
