= The Cockpit (student section) =

The Cockpit is the name of the student section for the South Carolina Gamecocks men's basketball team and South Carolina Gamecocks women's basketball teams, at the University of South Carolina's Colonial Life Arena.

In early November 2008, approximately 250 students participated in a competition in which they were asked to create a name for the student section for both men's and women's basketball games. Close to 350 possible names were submitted, with Cockpit, Cocky's Corner and Garnet Army emerging as the top three choices. A committee consisting of athletics marketing, basketball personnel and student government made the final decision on the official name for the student section.
The naming choice was made because of the proximity of the university to Fort Jackson Military Base, the marketability of garnet camo, and because the voters wanted to have something unique and not easily replicated by any other school.

== Introduction of The Garnet Army ==
The official launch of the new student fan section debuted on Wednesday, Jan. 21, 2009, in conjunction with the men's basketball contest against Florida. Senior Guard, Zam Fredrick's layup as time expired lifted South Carolina to a 70-69 victory over No. 24 Florida, ending the Gators' 10-game win streak. Fredrick took an on-target pass in stride from forward Mike Holmes and scored the winning hoop just before the buzzer sounded. The play and the reaction from the crowd was featured on ESPN's top 10 plays, and it was announced to the world; The Garnet Army had arrived.

== Garnet Army Camo Gear ==
Garnet Army T-shirts

Originally there were 750 shirts allotted for distribution at the Florida game on January 21, 2009. With the great success experienced at the debut, the university funded more T-shirts and gave out another 2000 over the next few home games. Garnet Army shirts continue to be released at specific home games to the first students to get in the gate. Students are also given the opportunity to purchase the T-shirts before home games.

Only students are given official Garnet Army T-shirts.

In January 2011 Garnet and Black Traditions began selling "Garnet Army Reserves" shirts to the public.

Army gear

Other gear that has become custom for the Garnet Army includes: Garnet combat helmets, garnet army hats, army combat boots, garnet & black camo body paint.

== Garnet Army Boot Camp ==
Another tradition developed by Coach Horn, was initiated in 2009 to indoctrinate the students into a unified and intimidating force. At the Garnet Army Boot Camp, students were able to interact with players and coaches, and gather knowledge on what Coach Horn's mission was for the Garnet Army.
