= 1932–33 Iowa State Cyclones men's basketball team =

American college basketball season

1932–33 Iowa State Cyclones men's basketball
- Conference: Big Six Conference
- Record: 6–10 (2–8 Big Six)
- Head coach: Louis Menze (5th season)
- Home arena: State Gymnasium

1932–33 Big Six Conference men's basketball standings
	Conf.				Overall
Team	W		L	PCT	W		L	PCT
Kansas	8	–	2	.800	13	–	4	.765
Oklahoma	7	–	3	.700	12	–	5	.706
Missouri	6	–	4	.600	10	–	8	.556
Kansas State	4	–	6	.400	9	–	9	.500
Nebraska	3	–	7	.300	3	–	13	.188
Iowa State	2	–	8	.200	6	–	10	.375

The 1932–33 Iowa State Cyclones men's basketball team represented Iowa State University during the 1932–33 NCAA men's basketball season. The Cyclones were coached by Louis Menze, who was in his fifth season with the Cyclones. They played their home games at the State Gymnasium in Ames, Iowa.

They finished the season 6–10, 2–8 in Big Six play to finish in last place.

== Roster ==
1932–33 Iowa State Cyclones men's basketball team
Players
Coaches

Pos.	#	Name	Height	Weight	Year	Hometown
		Anderson	—	—
G		Russell Baskerville	—	—
		Homer Batman	—	—		Ames, Iowa
G		Clyde Dills	—	—
G		Frank Hood	—	—		Creston, Iowa
		Victor Jones	—	—
G		Isadore Levine	—	—
G		Loufek	—	—
F		Adolph Ludwig	—	—	Sr	Lawton, Iowa
		Herbert Ohrt	—	—
		Ronald Sieben	—	—		Geneseo, Illinois
G		Harold Templeton	—	—
F		Ralph Thomson (C)	—	—	Sr	Omaha, Nebraska
		Marlowe Williams	—	—
C	14	Waldo Wegner	6 ft 4 in (1.93 m)	200 lb (91 kg)	So	Everly, Iowa

Head coach

- Louis Menze

Assistant coach(es)

Legend

- (C) Team captain
- (S) Suspended
- (I) Ineligible
- (W) Walk-on
- Injured
- Current redshirt

== Schedule and results ==
Date time, TV	Rank^{#}	Opponent^{#}	Result	Record	Site city, state
Regular season
December 9, 1932*		Coe	L 23–41	0–1	State Gymnasium; Ames, Iowa
December 16, 1932*; 7:30 pm		Central	W 31–19	1–1	State Gymnasium; Ames, Iowa
December 21, 1932*		Drake; Iowa Big Four	W 41–22	2–1	State Gymnasium; Ames, Iowa
December 30, 1932*; 8:15 pm		at Drake; Iowa Big Four	W 33–22	3–1	Drake Fieldhouse; Des Moines, Iowa
January 2, 1933*		Iowa State Teacher's (Northern Iowa); Iowa Big Four	W 29–23	4–1	State Gymnasium; Ames, Iowa
January 6, 1933; 7:30 pm		Oklahoma	W 31–25	5–1 (1–0)	State Gymnasium; Ames, Iowa
January 14, 1933		at Missouri	L 22–29	5–2 (1–1)	Brewer Fieldhouse; Columbia, Missouri
January 24, 1933		Kansas	L 20–35	5–3 (1–2)	State Gymnasium; Ames, Iowa
January 28, 1933		at Kansas State	L 23–33	5–4 (1–3)	Nichols Hall; Manhattan, Kansas
January 30, 1933		at Nebraska	L 16–25	5–5 (1–4)	Nebraska Coliseum; Lincoln, Nebraska
February 9, 1933		Kansas State	L 27–28	5–6 (1–5)	State Gymnasium; Ames, Iowa
February 10, 1933*		Drake; Iowa Big Four	L 27–30	5–7	State Gymnasium; Ames, Iowa
February 18, 1933		at Kansas	L 19–33	5–8 (1–6)	Hoch Auditorium; Lawrence, Kansas
February 20, 1933		at Oklahoma	L 26–44	5–9 (1–7)	OU Field House; Norman, Oklahoma
February 24, 1933		Missouri	W 32–31	6–9 (2–7)	State Gymnasium; Ames, Iowa
February 28, 1933		Nebraska	L 16–43	6–10 (2–8)	State Gymnasium; Ames, Iowa
*Non-conference game. ^{#}Rankings from AP poll. (#) Tournament seedings in parentheses. All times are in Central Time.
