= 1932–33 Kentucky Wildcats men's basketball team =

1932–33 season of University of Kentucky men's basketball team

1932–33 Kentucky Wildcats men's basketball

SEC Regular Season & Tournament Champions Helms Foundation National Champions
- Conference: Southeastern Conference
- Record: 21–3 (8–0 SEC)
- Head coach: Adolph Rupp (3rd season)
- Captain: Forest Sale
- Home arena: Alumni Gymnasium

1932–33 Southeastern Conference men's basketball standings
	Conf.				Overall
Team	W		L	PCT	W		L	PCT
Kentucky †	8	–	0	1.000	21	–	3	.875
Alabama	12	–	3	.800	14	–	5	.737
Vanderbilt	11	–	5	.688	14	–	8	.636
LSU	13	–	7	.650	15	–	8	.652
Georgia Tech	7	–	5	.583	9	–	6	.600
Florida	4	–	4	.500	9	–	5	.643
Georgia	5	–	6	.455	9	–	10	.474
Ole Miss	5	–	7	.417	6	–	12	.333
Auburn	4	–	7	.364	4	–	9	.308
Tulane	6	–	14	.300	8	–	15	.348
Tennessee	3	–	7	.300	9	–	11	.450
Mississippi State	3	–	9	.250	6	–	13	.316
Sewanee	0	–	7	.000	1	–	10	.091
† 1933 SEC Tournament winner

The 1932–33 Kentucky Wildcats men's basketball team represented the University of Kentucky in intercollegiate basketball during the 1932–33 season. The team finished the season with a 21–3 record and were named national champions by the Helms Athletic Foundation. It would be the first of five national championships at Kentucky for head coach Adolph Rupp. Senior center–forward Forest Sale was named a consensus All-American as well as the national player of the year at the season's conclusion.

== Schedule and results ==
Date time, TV	Rank^{#}	Opponent^{#}	Result	Record	Site city, state
Regular season
12/9/1932*		Kentucky Alumni	W 52–17	1–0	Alumni Gymnasium; Lexington, Kentucky
12/12/1932*		Georgetown	W 62–21	2–0	Alumni Gymnasium; Lexington, Kentucky
12/17/1932*		vs. Marshall	W 57–23	3–0	Ashland High School Gymnasium; Ashland, Kentucky
12/20/1932		Tulane	W 53–17	4–0 (1–0)	Alumni Gymnasium; Lexington, Kentucky
12/21/1932		Tulane	W 42–11	5–0 (2–0)	Alumni Gymnasium; Lexington, Kentucky
12/30/1932*		at Chicago	W 58–26	6–0	Chicago
1/2/1933*		Ohio State	L 30–46	6–1	Alumni Gymnasium; Lexington, Kentucky
1/6/1933*		at Creighton	W 32–26	7–1	University Gymnasium; Omaha, Nebraska
1/7/1933*		at Creighton	L 22–34	7–2	University Gymnasium; Omaha, Nebraska
1/10/1933*		South Carolina	W 44–36	8–2	Alumni Gymnasium; Lexington, Kentucky
1/14/1933		at Tennessee; Rivalry	W 42–21	9–2 (3–0)	Knoxville, Tennessee
1/16/1933*		Clemson	W 67–18	10–2	Alumni Gymnasium; Lexington, Kentucky
1/28/1933		Tennessee; Rivalry	W 44–23	11–2 (4–0)	Alumni Gymnasium; Lexington, Kentucky
1/31/1933		at Vanderbilt	W 40–29	12–2 (5–0)	Old Gym; Nashville, Tennessee
2/1/1933*		at Clemson	W 42–32	13–2	Clemson Field House; Calhoun, South Carolina
2/2/1933*		at South Carolina	L 38–44	13–3	Columbia, South Carolina
2/6/1933*		Mexico	W 81–22	14–3	Alumni Gymnasium; Lexington, Kentucky
2/11/1933		Georgia Tech	W 45–22	15–3 (6–0)	Alumni Gymnasium; Lexington, Kentucky
2/13/1933		vs. Alabama	W 35–31	16–3 (7–0)	Birmingham Athletic Club; Birmingham, Alabama
2/18/1933		Vanderbilt	W 45–28	17–3 (8–0)	Alumni Gymnasium; Lexington, Kentucky
SEC Tournament
2/24/1933		vs. Ole Miss; SEC Tournament first round	W 49–31	18–3	Atlanta Memorial Auditorium; Atlanta
2/25/1933		vs. Florida; SEC Tournament quarterfinals / Rivalry	W 48–24	19–3	Atlanta Memorial Auditorium; Atlanta
2/27/1933		vs. LSU; SEC Tournament semifinals	W 51–38	20–3	Atlanta Memorial Auditorium; Atlanta
2/28/1933		vs. Mississippi State; SEC Tournament Championship	W 46–27	21–3	Atlanta Memorial Auditorium; Atlanta
*Non-conference game. ^{#}Rankings from AP Poll. (#) Tournament seedings in parentheses.

== Leading scorers ==
Name	Position	Year	PPG
Forest Sale	C-F	Senior	13.8
John DeMoisey	C-F	Junior	12.0
Bill Davis	G	Junior	7.0
Darrell Darby	F	Senior	4.0
Ellis T. Johnson	G	Senior	3.8
