= 1932–33 La Salle Explorers men's basketball team =

American college basketball season

1932–33 La Salle Explorers men's basketball
- Conference: Independent
- Record: 13–3
- Head coach: Thomas Conley (2nd season)
- Captain: Joe Meehan
- Home arena: Wister Hall

The 1932–33 La Salle Explorers men's basketball team represented La Salle University during the 1932–33 NCAA men's basketball season. The head coach was Thomas Conley, coaching the explorers in his second season. The team finished with an overall record of 13–3.

== Schedule ==
Date time, TV	Opponent	Result	Record	Site city, state
Dec. 5, 1932*	Seton Hall	W 31–28	1–0	Wister Hall; Philadelphia, PA
Dec. 13, 1932*	Penn A.C.	W 28–19	2–0	Wister Hall; Philadelphia, PA
Dec. 16, 1932*	Catholic	W 33–21	3–0	Wister Hall; Philadelphia, PA
Dec 17, 1932*	Cooper Union	W 33–16	4–0	Wister Hall; Philadelphia, PA
Jan. 6, 1933*	at Mount St. Mary's	L 28–34	4–1	Emmitsburg, MD
Jan 11, 1933*	at Seton Hall	L 20–37	4–2	South Orange, NJ
Jan 14, 1933*	Baltimore	W 25–14	5–2	Wister Hall; Philadelphia, PA
Jan 17, 1933*	West Chester	W 33–30	6–2	Wister Hall; Philadelphia, PA
Jan 20, 1933*	Susquehanna	W 39–26	7–2	Wister Hall; Philadelphia, PA
Jan 27, 1933*	at Scranton	L 29–38	7–3	Scranton, PA
Feb. 1, 1933*	at West Chester	W 33–17	8–3	West Chester, PA
Feb. 3, 1933*	St. Thomas	W 36–25	9–3	Wister Hall; Philadelphia, PA
Feb. 10, 1933*	Rider	W 39–29	10–3	Philadelphia, PA
Feb. 16, 1933*	at Penn A.C.	W 32–25	11–3	Philadelphia, PA
Feb. 18, 1933*	Mount St. Mary's	W 32–14	12–3	Wister Hall; Philadelphia, PA
Mar. 1, 1933*	at Delaware	W 38–27	13–3	Newark, DE
*Non-conference game. (#) Tournament seedings in parentheses.
