= Paul Mooney (basketball) =

American basketball player and coach (1897–1977)

Biographical details
- Born: March 18, 1897
- Died: May 3, 1977 (aged 80)

Playing career
- 1916–1918: NYU
- 1919–1920: NYU
- 1920: Paterson Crescents
- 1920–1921: Nanticoke Nans
- 1921–1922: Mohawk Indians
- 1922–1923: Amsterdam

Coaching career (HC unless noted)
- 1923–1925: NYU (Assistant)
- 1925–1934: Columbia (Assistant)
- 1934–1942: Columbia
- 1945–1946: Columbia

Head coaching record
- Overall: 96–67 (.589)

Accomplishments and honors

Championships
- 1x Eastern Intercollegiate Basketball League championship (1936)

Paul Peter Mooney (March 18, 1897 – May 3, 1977) was an American basketball player and coach who was the head men's basketball coach at Columbia University from 1934 to 1946.

== Playing ==
Mooney was the starting center for the NYU Violets men's basketball team that won the 1920 AAU men's basketball championship. He played professionally for the Paterson Crescents, Nanticoke Nans, Mohawk Indians, and Amsterdam.

== Coaching ==
Mooney began his coaching career as an assistant at his alma mater. After two seasons, he moved to Columbia, where he was an assistant under Daniel Meenan. Meenan and Mooney led the Columbia Lions men's basketball team to the Eastern Intercollegiate Basketball League title in 1926, 1930, and 1931. In 1934, Mooney succeeded Meenan as head coach. He led the Lions to an Eastern Intercollegiate Basketball League championship in 1936. In 1942, Mooney entered the United States Navy as a physical instructor in the Naval Air Corps. He was a part of the physical education program at the University of Iowa Pre-Flight School and had reached the rank of Lieutenant commander when he was mustered out in May 1945. He immediately resumed his coaching duties at Columbia, but resigned after the 1945–46 season to enter private business.
