= 1932–33 Illinois Fighting Illini men's basketball team =

American college basketball season

1932–33 Illinois Fighting Illini men's basketball
- Conference: Big Ten Conference
- Record: 11–7 (6-6 Big Ten)
- Head coach: J. Craig Ruby (11th season)
- Assistant coach: John P. Sabo (5th season)
- Captain: William "Boyd" Owen
- Home arena: Huff Hall

1932–33 Big Ten Conference men's basketball standings
	Conf.				Overall
Team	W		L	PCT	W		L	PCT
Ohio State	10	–	2	.833	17	–	3	.850
Northwestern	10	–	2	.833	15	–	4	.789
Iowa	8	–	4	.667	15	–	5	.750
Michigan	8	–	4	.667	10	–	8	.556
Illinois	6	–	6	.500	11	–	7	.611
Purdue	6	–	6	.500	11	–	7	.611
Indiana	6	–	6	.500	10	–	8	.556
Wisconsin	4	–	8	.333	7	–	13	.350
Minnesota	1	–	11	.083	5	–	15	.250
Chicago	1	–	11	.083	2	–	16	.111

The 1932–33 Illinois Fighting Illini men's basketball team represented the University of Illinois.

== Regular season ==
Craig Ruby entered the 1932–33 season tied with Ralph Jones as the winningest coach in the history at the University of Illinois with 85 wins. Ruby had 9 returning lettermen from a team that had finished in fifth place in the Big Ten the year before. The team went through a nearly perfect non-conference season, losing only 1 game, however, the Fighting Illini showed no improvement in conference play by finishing with a record of 6 wins and 6 losses. The team finished the season with an overall record of 11 wins 7 losses. The starting lineup included captain Boyd Owen and Albert Kamm at guard, Frank Froschauer and Coslon Bennett as forwards and Hudson Hellmich at center.

=== Roster ===
1932–33 Illinois Fighting Illini men's basketball team
Players
Coaches

Pos.	#	Name	Height	Weight	Year	Hometown
F	4	Hudson Hellmich	—	—	Jr	Webster Groves, Missouri
G	5	William "Boyd" Owen (C)	—	—	Sr	South Bend, Indiana
G	6	Jack Beynon	—	—	So	Rockford, Illinois
F	7	Coslon Bennett	—	—	Sr	Marshall, Illinois
F	8	Frank Froschauer	—	—	So	Harvey, Illinois
F	9	Karl Rohlen	—	—	So	Chicago, Illinois
C	10	Sidney Port	—	—	Jr	Chicago, Illinois
F	12	Carl E. Soderstrom	—	—	So	Chicago, Illinois
C	14	Vernon Moore	—	—	Sr	Martinsville, Illinois
F	15	Fred Fencl	—	—	Jr	Cicero, Illinois
G	17	Paul Gibbs	—	—	Fr	Los Angeles, California
C	18	Alfred J. Kamm	—	—	Jr	Lakewood, Washington
G	19	Albert C. Kamm	—	—	Jr	Lakewood, Washington
G	22	William Theobald	—	—	Sr	Du Quoin, Illinois
F	24	Paul Carson	—	—	Jr	Fairbury, Illinois
F	25	Raymond Herman Radant	—	—	So	Wausau, Wisconsin
G	26	Elbert Gragg	—	—	So	Denver, Colorado
F	27	Roy Guttschow	—	—	So	Simi Valley, California
G	28	William Gates	—	—	So	Rockford, Illinois

Head coach

- Craig Ruby (University of Missouri) (11th year)

Assistant coach(es)

- John Sabo (University of Illinois) (5th year)

Legend

- (C) Team captain
- (S) Suspended
- (I) Ineligible
- (W) Walk-on
- Injured
- Current redshirt

Roster

== Schedule ==
Date time, TV	Rank^{#}	Opponent^{#}	Result	Record	Site (attendance) city, state
Non-Conference regular season
12/10/1932*		at Bradley	W 26–21	1-0	Hewitt Gymnasium (4,000); Peoria, IL
12/17/1932*		Wabash	L 24–34	1-1	Huff Hall (3,000); Champaign, IL
12/21/1932*		at Missouri; Braggin' Rights	L 17-22	2-1	Brewer Field House (2,000); Columbia, MO
12/30/1932*		North Dakota	W 26–24	3-1	Huff Hall (500); Champaign, IL
1/3/1933*		Detroit	W 39–28	4-1	Huff Hall (4,000); Champaign, IL
Big Ten regular season
1/7/1933		Northwestern; Rivalry	W 27–25	5-1 (1-0)	Huff Hall (4,000); Champaign, IL
1/9/1933		Michigan	W 22–17	6-1 (2-0)	Huff Hall (6,500); Champaign, IL
1/14/1933		at Michigan	L 30–35	6-2 (2-1)	Yost Field House (4,500); Ann Arbor, MI
1/16/1933		at Ohio State	L 22–33	6-3 (2-2)	Ohio Expo Center Coliseum (6,000); Columbus, OH
1/21/1933		at Northwestern; Rivalry	L 27–30	6-4 (2-3)	Patten Gymnasium (-); Evanston, IL
2/7/1933*		St. Louis	W 26–19	7-4	Huff Hall (2,000); Champaign, IL
2/11/1933		Wisconsin	W 38–25	8-4 (3-3)	Huff Hall (4,000); Champaign, IL
2/13/1933		Ohio State	L 29–31	8-5 (3-4)	Huff Hall (5,500); Champaign, IL
2/18/1933		at Minnesota	W 26–22	9-5 (4-4)	Williams Arena (-); Minneapolis, MN
2/20/1933		at Wisconsin	W 29–15	10-5 (5-4)	Wisconsin Field House (-); Madison, WI
2/25/1933		Minnesota	L 28–30	10-6 (5-5)	Huff Hall (-); Champaign, IL
2/27/1933		at Iowa; Rivalry	L 27–30	10-7 (5-6)	Iowa Field House (-); Iowa City, IA
3/4/1933		Iowa; Rivalry	W 44–16	11-7 (6-6)	Huff Hall (-); Champaign, IL
*Non-conference game. ^{#}Rankings from AP Poll. (#) Tournament seedings in parentheses. All times are in Central Time.
