= 1932–33 Michigan Wolverines men's basketball team =

American college basketball season

1932–33 Michigan Wolverines men's basketball
- Conference: Big Ten Conference
- Record: 10–8 (8–4 Big Ten)
- Head coach: Franklin Cappon
- Captain: DeForest Eveland
- Home arena: Yost Field House

1932–33 Big Ten Conference men's basketball standings
	Conf.				Overall
Team	W		L	PCT	W		L	PCT
Ohio State	10	–	2	.833	17	–	3	.850
Northwestern	10	–	2	.833	15	–	4	.789
Iowa	8	–	4	.667	15	–	5	.750
Michigan	8	–	4	.667	10	–	8	.556
Illinois	6	–	6	.500	11	–	7	.611
Purdue	6	–	6	.500	11	–	7	.611
Indiana	6	–	6	.500	10	–	8	.556
Wisconsin	4	–	8	.333	7	–	13	.350
Minnesota	1	–	11	.083	5	–	15	.250
Chicago	1	–	11	.083	2	–	16	.111

The 1932–33 Michigan Wolverines men's basketball team represented the University of Michigan in intercollegiate basketball during the 1932–33 season. The team compiled a 10–8 record and 8–4 against Big Ten Conference opponents. The team finished in a tie for third place in the Big Ten.

Franklin Cappon was in his second year as the team's head coach. DeForest Eveland was the team captain and the team's leading scorer with 133 points in 18 games for an average of 7.4 points per game.

== Scoring statistics ==
Player	Games	Field goals	Free throws	Points	Points per game
DeForest Eveland	18	50	33	133	7.4
James Garner	18	53	23	129	7.2
Raymond Altenhof	17	33	16	82	4.8
Alfred Plummer	14	25	8	58	4.1
Fred Petoskey	18	16	13	45	2.5
Robert Petrie	14	17	6	40	2.9
Totals	18	216	107	539	29.9
