= 1933 SEC men's basketball tournament =

- Classification: Division I
- Teams: 13
- Site: Atlanta Athletic Club; Atlanta, Georgia
- Champions: Kentucky (1st title)
- Winning coach: Adolph Rupp (1st title)

1932–33 Southeastern Conference men's basketball standings
	Conf.				Overall
Team	W		L	PCT	W		L	PCT
Kentucky †	8	–	0	1.000	21	–	3	.875
Alabama	12	–	3	.800	14	–	5	.737
Vanderbilt	11	–	5	.688	14	–	8	.636
LSU	13	–	7	.650	15	–	8	.652
Georgia Tech	7	–	5	.583	9	–	6	.600
Florida	4	–	4	.500	9	–	5	.643
Georgia	5	–	6	.455	9	–	10	.474
Ole Miss	5	–	7	.417	6	–	12	.333
Auburn	4	–	7	.364	4	–	9	.308
Tulane	6	–	14	.300	8	–	15	.348
Tennessee	3	–	7	.300	9	–	11	.450
Mississippi State	3	–	9	.250	6	–	13	.316
Sewanee	0	–	7	.000	1	–	10	.091
† 1933 SEC Tournament winner

The 1933 Southeastern Conference men's basketball tournament took place on February 24–28, 1933 in Atlanta, Georgia at the Atlanta Athletic Club. It was the first SEC basketball tournament in history.

Kentucky won the tournament by beating Mississippi State in the championship game.

== Bracket ==
First Round
Alabama	41
Sewanee	28
Tulane	46
Georgia	22
Kentucky	49
Ole Miss	31
LSU	57
Auburn	33
Tennessee	30
Georgia Tech	24

Quarterfinals
Mississippi State	30
Alabama	25
Vanderbilt	28
Tulane	25
Florida	24
Kentucky	48
LSU	55
Tennessee	43

Semifinals
Mississippi State	48
Vanderbilt	36
Kentucky	51
LSU	38

Finals
Mississippi State	27
Kentucky	46

== All-Tournament Team ==
=== First Team ===
- F—John DeMoisey, Kentucky
- F—Frank Waits, Mississippi State
- C—Aggie Sale, Kentucky
- G—Ellis T. Johnson, Kentucky
- G—Sparky Wade, LSU

=== Second Team ===
- F—Buddy Blair, LSU
- F—Jack Harris, LSU
- C—Buford Taylor, Mississippi State
- G—George Pillow, Mississippi State
- G—Bill Davis, Kentucky
