= 1933 Southern Conference men's basketball tournament =

- Classification: Division I
- Teams: 8
- Site: Thompson Gym; Raleigh, NC
- Champions: South Carolina (1st title)
- Winning coach: Billy Laval (1st title)

1932–33 Southern Conference men's basketball standings
	Conf.				Overall
Team	W		L	PCT	W		L	PCT
South Carolina †	4	–	0	1.000	17	–	2	.895
Duke	7	–	3	.700	17	–	5	.773
Maryland	7	–	3	.700	11	–	9	.550
NC State	6	–	3	.667	11	–	8	.579
North Carolina	5	–	3	.625	12	–	5	.706
Virginia	5	–	3	.625	12	–	6	.667
Virginia Tech	3	–	7	.300	5	–	10	.333
VMI	2	–	8	.200	5	–	10	.333
Washington and Lee	1	–	8	.111	6	–	10	.375
Clemson	0	–	2	.000	10	–	9	.526
† Southern Conference Tournament winner

The 1933 Southern Conference men's basketball tournament took place from February 24–27, 1933 at Thompson Gym in Raleigh, North Carolina. The South Carolina Gamecocks won their first Southern Conference title, led by head coach Billy Laval.

== Format ==
The top eight finishers of the conference's ten members were eligible for the tournament. Teams were seeded based on conference winning percentage. The tournament used a preset bracket consisting of three rounds.

== Bracket ==
Quarterfinals; February 24
North Carolina	32
Virginia Tech	27
South Carolina	65
Maryland	28
Washington & Lee	35
NC State	34
Duke	38
Virginia	24

Semifinals; February 25
North Carolina	32
South Carolina	34
Washington & Lee	32
Duke	41

Finals; February 27
South Carolina	33
Duke	21

* Overtime game

== See also ==
- List of Southern Conference men's basketball champions
