= 1932–33 Wisconsin Badgers men's basketball team =

American college basketball season

1932–33 Wisconsin Badgers men's basketball
- Conference: Big Ten Conference
- Record: 7–13 (4–8 Big Ten)
- Head coach: Walter Meanwell
- Home arena: UW Fieldhouse

1932–33 Big Ten Conference men's basketball standings
	Conf.				Overall
Team	W		L	PCT	W		L	PCT
Ohio State	10	–	2	.833	17	–	3	.850
Northwestern	10	–	2	.833	15	–	4	.789
Iowa	8	–	4	.667	15	–	5	.750
Michigan	8	–	4	.667	10	–	8	.556
Illinois	6	–	6	.500	11	–	7	.611
Purdue	6	–	6	.500	11	–	7	.611
Indiana	6	–	6	.500	10	–	8	.556
Wisconsin	4	–	8	.333	7	–	13	.350
Minnesota	1	–	11	.083	5	–	15	.250
Chicago	1	–	11	.083	2	–	16	.111

The 1932–33 Wisconsin Badgers men's basketball team represented University of Wisconsin–Madison. The head coach was Walter Meanwell, coaching his nineteenth season with the Badgers. The team played their home games at the UW Fieldhouse in Madison, Wisconsin and was a member of the Big Ten Conference.

== Schedule ==
Date time, TV	Rank^{#}	Opponent^{#}	Result	Record	Site city, state
Regular Season
12/10/1932*		Carleton (MN)	L 29–34	0–1	UW Fieldhouse; Madison, Wisconsin
12/17/1932*		Marquette	L 16–18	0–2	UW Fieldhouse; Madison, Wisconsin
12/22/1932*		at Maryland	W 22–13	1–2	Ritchie Coliseum; College Park, Maryland
12/30/1932*		Michigan State	W 26–16	2–2	UW Fieldhouse; Madison, Wisconsin
1/03/1933*		at Marquette	L 16–22	2–3	Marquette Gymnasium; Milwaukee
1/07/1933		Chicago	W 26–17	3–3 (1–0)	UW Fieldhouse; Madison, Wisconsin
1/09/1933		Iowa	W 21–19	4–3 (2–0)	UW Fieldhouse; Madison, Wisconsin
1/14/1933		at Indiana	W 38–37 ^{OT}	5–3 (3–0)	IU Fieldhouse; Bloomington, Indiana
1/16/1933		at Northwestern	L 22–40	5–4 (3–1)	Patten Gymnasium; Evanston, Illinois
2/03/1933*		Loyola (IL)	W 28–26	6–4	UW Fieldhouse; Madison, Wisconsin
2/06/1933		Ohio State	L 30–31	6–5 (3–2)	UW Fieldhouse; Madison, Wisconsin
2/11/1933		at Illinois	L 25–38	6–6 (3–3)	Huff Hall; Champaign, Illinois
2/13/1933		at Iowa	L 25–31	6–7 (3–4)	Iowa Field House; Iowa City, IA
2/18/1933		Indiana	L 28–29 ^{OT}	6–8 (3–5)	UW Fieldhouse; Madison, Wisconsin
2/20/1933		Illinois	L 15–29	6–9 (3–6)	UW Fieldhouse; Madison, Wisconsin
2/25/1933		Northwestern	L 28–30	6–10 (3–7)	UW Fieldhouse; Madison, Wisconsin
2/27/1933*		at Central State (WI)	L 24–28	6–11	Lincoln Fieldhouse; Wisconsin Rapids, Wisconsin
3/04/1933		Ohio State	L 20–37	6–12 (3–8)	Ohio Expo Center Coliseum; Columbus, Ohio
3/06/1933		at Chicago	W 28–16	7–12 (4–8)	Henry Crown Field House; Chicago, Illinois
3/07/1933*		at Loyola (IL)	L 24–39	7–13	Alumni Gym; Chicago
*Non-conference game. ^{#}Rankings from AP Poll. (#) Tournament seedings in parentheses.
