= Chuck Noe =

American basketball coach and broadcaster

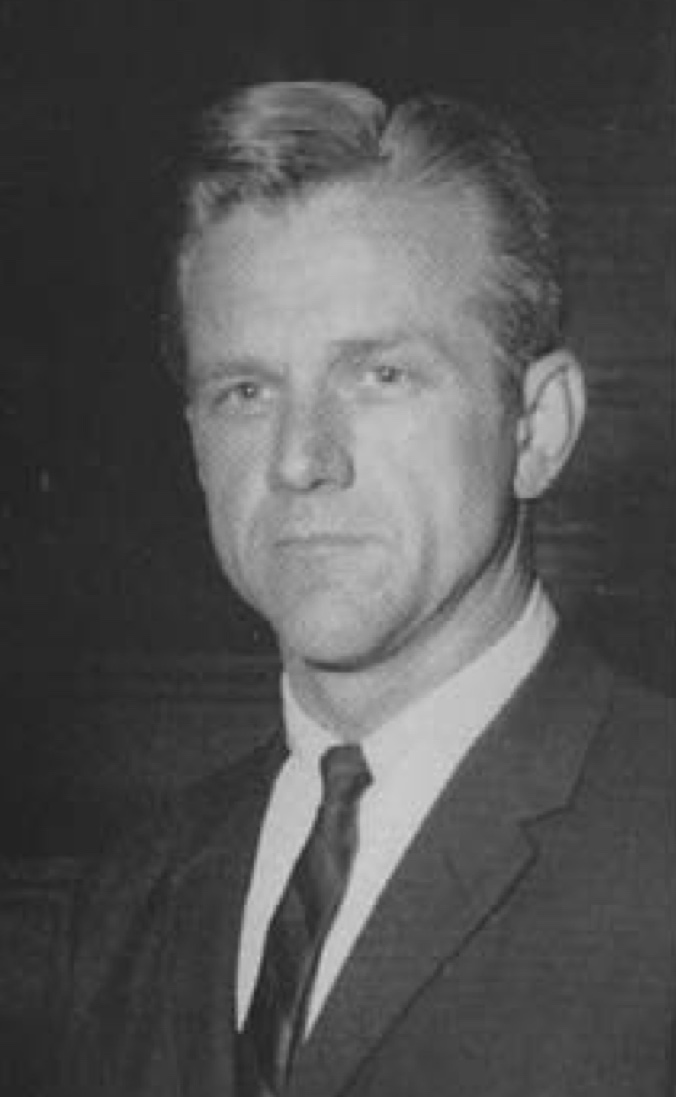
- Noe from the 1964 Garnet & Black

Biographical details
- Born: November 13, 1924; Louisville, Kentucky, U.S.
- Died: December 8, 2003 (aged 79); Richmond, Virginia, U.S.

Playing career

Basketball
- 1944–1948: Virginia

Baseball
- 1946–1948: Virginia
- 1948: El Paso Texans
- 1950: Virginia

Coaching career (HC unless noted)

Basketball
- 1948–1949: Virginia (assistant)
- 1950–1951: Madison County HS
- 1951–1952: Hopewell HS
- 1952–1955: VMI
- 1955–1962: Virginia Tech
- 1962–1964: South Carolina
- 1970–1976: VCU

Baseball
- 1951: Madison County HS
- 1953–1955: VMI

Football
- 1950: Madison County HS

Administrative career (AD unless noted)
- 1970–1976: VCU

Head coaching record
- Overall: 241–160 (college basketball); 24–14 (college baseball)

Accomplishments and honors

Championships
- Basketball; SoCon regular season (1960)

Awards
- Basketball; 2× SoCon Coach of the Year (1956, 1962)

Charles Warren Noe (November 13, 1924 – December 8, 2003) was an American college basketball coach and broadcaster. Noe was credited by former University of North Carolina basketball coach Dean Smith with creating the 4-corner "stall" offense for which Smith became famous for utilizing at UNC, during Noe's time as hoops coach at the University of South Carolina.

Chuck Noe was a two-sport athlete at the University of Virginia, lettering in both basketball and baseball from 1944 to 1948. Following his collegiate career, Noe played briefly in the Boston Red Sox chain, but his career ended due to a severely dislocated ankle.

Following the early end of his playing career, Noe turned to coaching. He was first an assistant basketball coach at his alma mater, the University of Virginia, in 1948–49. He then coached at the high school level in the state of Virginia—football, basketball, and baseball at Madison County High School in 1950–51 and basketball at Hopewell High School in 1951–52. Noe got his first college head coaching job in 1952 when he was named head coach at the Virginia Military Institute (VMI). Following three years at VMI, Noe moved to the same position at Virginia Tech.

At Virginia Tech, Noe had a successful seven-year stint. His teams went 109–51 and in the 1959–60 season won the Southern Conference regular season championship, beating out West Virginia and star guard Jerry West. His contributions at Tech earned him a spot in the university's sports hall of fame.

In 1962, Noe moved to South Carolina where he accumulated a record of 15–21 in a year and a half. In 1970, Noe became head basketball coach and athletic director at Virginia Commonwealth University (VCU) and led the program to NCAA Division I status. He went 95–42 in six years as head basketball coach at VCU. Following his career as a head coach, Noe became a sports radio host in Richmond, Virginia.

He died on December 8, 2003, in Richmond.

== Head coaching record ==
=== College basketball ===
Record table
Season	Team	Overall	Conference	Standing	Postseason
VMI Keydets (Southern Conference) (1952–1955)
1952–53	VMI	5–19	1–14	15th	
1953–54	VMI	11–12	6–7	5th	
1954–55	VMI	8–15	4–9	8th	
VMI:		24–46	11–30		
Virginia Tech Hokies (Southern Conference) (1955–1962)
1955–56	Virginia Tech	14–11	10–7	3rd	
1956–57	Virginia Tech	14–8	12–5	3rd	
1957–58	Virginia Tech	11–8	10–5	2nd	
1958–59	Virginia Tech	16–5	10–2	2nd	
1959–60	Virginia Tech	20–6	12–1	1st	
1960–61	Virginia Tech	15–7	12–3	2nd	
1961–62	Virginia Tech	19–6	9–3	2nd	
Virginia Tech:		109–51	75–26		
South Carolina Gamecocks (Atlantic Coast Conference) (1962–1964)
1962–63	South Carolina	9–15	4–10	T–6th	
1963–64	South Carolina	6–6	3–3	4th	
South Carolina:		15–21	7–13		
VCU Rams (Independent) (1970–1976)
1970–71	VCU	15–9			
1971–72	VCU	15–4			
1972–73	VCU	15–5			
1973–74	VCU	17–7			
1974–75	VCU	17–8			
1975–76	VCU	16–9			
VCU:		95–42			
Total:		243–160			
National champion Postseason invitational champion Conference regular season champion Conference regular season and conference tournament champion Division regular season champion Division regular season and conference tournament champion Conference tournament champion
