= 1932–33 Indiana Hoosiers men's basketball team =

American college basketball season

1932–33 Indiana Hoosiers men's basketball
- Conference: Big Ten Conference
- Record: 10–8 (6–6 Big Ten)
- Head coach: Everett Dean (9th season)
- Captain: Glendon Hodson
- Home arena: The Fieldhouse

1932–33 Big Ten Conference men's basketball standings
| | Conf. | | | | Overall |
| Team | W | | L | PCT | W | | L | PCT |
|---|---|---|---|---|---|---|---|---|
| Ohio State | 10 | – | 2 | .833 | 17 | – | 3 | .850 |
| Northwestern | 10 | – | 2 | .833 | 15 | – | 4 | .789 |
| Iowa | 8 | – | 4 | .667 | 15 | – | 5 | .750 |
| Michigan | 8 | – | 4 | .667 | 10 | – | 8 | .556 |
| Illinois | 6 | – | 6 | .500 | 11 | – | 7 | .611 |
| Purdue | 6 | – | 6 | .500 | 11 | – | 7 | .611 |
| Indiana | 6 | – | 6 | .500 | 10 | – | 8 | .556 |
| Wisconsin | 4 | – | 8 | .333 | 7 | – | 13 | .350 |
| Minnesota | 1 | – | 11 | .083 | 5 | – | 15 | .250 |
| Chicago | 1 | – | 11 | .083 | 2 | – | 16 | .111 |

The 1932–33 Indiana Hoosiers men's basketball team represented Indiana University. Their head coach was Everett Dean, who was in his 9th year. The team played its home games in The Fieldhouse in Bloomington, Indiana, and was a member of the Big Ten Conference.

The Hoosiers finished the regular season with an overall record of 10–8 and a conference record of 6–6, finishing 6th in the Big Ten Conference.

== Roster ==
| No. | Name | Position | Ht. | Year | Hometown |
|---|---|---|---|---|---|
| 5 | Bernard Dickey | F/C | 6–1 | Sr. | Fort Wayne, Indiana |
| 13 | Glendon Hodson | F | 6–1 | Sr. | Amo, Indiana |
| 14 | Floyd Henry | F | 5–10 | So. | Kendallville, Indiana |
| 14 | Halary Sawicki | C | 6–3 | Sr. | Georgetown, Illinois |
| 16 | Ray Dauer | F | 6–1 | Jr. | Gary, Indiana |
| 17 | William Cordell | G | 5–9 | Sr. | Bloomington, Indiana |
| 18 | Woodrow Weir | F | 5–10 | Jr. | Scottsburg, Indiana |
| 20 | Warren Tucker | F | 6–1 | N/A | Salem, Indiana |
| 21 | Taylor Hoffar | C | 6–1 | Sr. | Seymour, Indiana |
| N/A | Keith Campbell | G | 5–10 | So. | Logansport, Indiana |
| N/A | Gilbert Carter | G | 5–8 | N/A | Indianapolis, Indiana |
| N/A | William Coulter | C | 6–3 | So. | Paoli, Indiana |
| N/A | Joe Gansinger | F | 6–1 | N/A | East Chicago, Indiana |
| N/A | Carl Gerber | G | 6–1 | N/A | Decatur, Indiana |
| N/A | Jack Heavenridge | G | 6–1 | So. | Washington, Indiana |
| N/A | Morris Himmelstein | G | 5–7 | N/A | Fort Wayne, Indiana |
| N/A | Charlie Hollers | G | 5–11 | N/A | Switz City, Indiana |
| N/A | Willard Kehrt | F | 5–11 | So. | Shelbyville, Indiana |
| N/A | Robert Porter | G | 6–1 | So. | Logansport, Indiana |

== Schedule/results ==
| Date time, TV | Rank^{#} | Opponent^{#} | Result | Record | Site city, state |
Regular season
| 12/6/1932* | | Wabash | W 22–21 | 1–0 | The Fieldhouse; Bloomington, Indiana |
| 12/9/1932* | | Cincinnati | W 41–12 | 2–0 | The Fieldhouse; Bloomington, Indiana |
| 12/14/1932* | | DePauw | W 34–19 | 3–0 | The Fieldhouse; Bloomington, Indiana |
| 12/20/1932* | | at Marquette | L 20–21 | 3–1 | Marquette Gymnasium; Milwaukee |
| 1/3/1933* | | at Miami (OH) | L 29–33 | 3–2 | Withrow Court; Oxford, Ohio |
| 1/7/1933 | | at Ohio State | L 28–35 | 3–3 (0–1) | Ohio Expo Center Coliseum; Columbus, Ohio |
| 1/9/1933 | | Chicago | W 34–21 | 4–3 (1–1) | The Fieldhouse; Bloomington, Indiana |
| 1/14/1933 | | Wisconsin | L 37–38 | 4–4 (1–2) | The Fieldhouse; Bloomington, Indiana |
| 2/1/1933* | | Mexico City | W 56–27 | 5–4 (1–2) | The Fieldhouse; Bloomington, Indiana |
| 2/6/1933 | | Northwestern | L 28–32 | 5–5 (1–3) | The Fieldhouse; Bloomington, Indiana |
| 2/11/1933 | | Minnesota | W 31–22 | 6–5 (2–3) | The Fieldhouse; Bloomington, Indiana |
| 2/13/1933 | | Michigan | L 25–32 | 6–6 (2–4) | The Fieldhouse; Bloomington, Indiana |
| 2/18/1933 | | at Wisconsin | W 29–28 | 7–6 (3–4) | Wisconsin Field House; Madison, Wisconsin |
| 2/20/1933 | | at Minnesota | W 36–25 | 8–6 (4–4) | Minnesota Field House; Minneapolis |
| 2/25/1933 | | at Chicago | L 32–34 | 8–7 (4–5) | Henry Crown Field House; Chicago |
| 2/27/1933 | | at Northwestern | L 32–45 | 8–8 (4–6) | Old Patten Gymnasium; Evanston, Illinois |
| 3/4/1933 | | Ohio State | W 40–28 | 9–8 (5–6) | The Fieldhouse; Bloomington, Indiana |
| 3/6/1933 | | at Michigan | W 31–30 | 10–8 (6–6) | Yost Field House; Ann Arbor, Michigan |
*Non-conference game. ^{#}Rankings from AP Poll. (#) Tournament seedings in parentheses.
