= South Carolina Gamecocks men's basketball =

University basketball team

| 2026–27 South Carolina Gamecocks men's basketball team |
- University: University of South Carolina
- First season: 1908–09; 118 years ago
- Athletic director: Jeremiah Donati
- Head coach: Lamont Paris; 5th season, 62–68 (.477)
- Location: Columbia, South Carolina
- Arena: Colonial Life Arena (capacity: 18,000)
- NCAA division: Division I
- Conference: SEC
- Nickname: Gamecocks
- Colors: Garnet and black
- Student section: The Cockpit
- All-time record: 1,530–1,364–1 (.529)
- NCAA tournament record: 8–11 (.421)

NCAA Division I tournament Final Four
- 2017
Other NCAA Division I tournament results
| Elite Eight | 2017 |
| Sweet Sixteen | 1971, 1972, 1973, 2017 |
| Appearances | 1971, 1972, 1973, 1974, 1989, 1997, 1998, 2004, 2017, 2024 |

NIT champions
- 2005, 2006

Conference tournament champions
- SoCon: 1933 ACC: 1971

Conference regular-season champions
- SoCon: 1927, 1933, 1934, 1945 ACC: 1970 SEC: 1997

Conference division champions
- SEC East: 1997, 2009

Uniforms
| Home | Away | Alternate |

The South Carolina Gamecocks men's basketball team represents the University of South Carolina and competes in the Southeastern Conference (SEC). The Gamecocks won Southern Conference titles in 1927, 1933, 1934, and 1945, and then they gained national attention under hall of fame coach Frank McGuire, posting a 205–65 record from 1967 to 1976, which included the 1970 Atlantic Coast Conference (ACC) championship, the 1971 ACC Tournament title, and four consecutive NCAA tournament appearances from 1971 to 1974. The program also won the 1997 SEC championship, National Invitation Tournament (NIT) titles in 2005 and 2006, and co-champions of the 2009 SEC East division title. Most recently, the Gamecocks won the 2017 NCAA East Regional Championship, reaching the Final Four for the first time in school history. Lamont Paris is the current head coach, and the team plays at the 18,000-seat Colonial Life Arena.

== History ==
=== Southern Conference years ===
South Carolina achieved a measure of regional prominence during its tenure in the Southern Conference, winning regular season championships in 1927, 1933, 1934, and 1945. The program also won the conference's tournament championship in 1933. During World War II, the basketball team's success was partially attributed to being assigned outstanding athletes by the U.S. Navy as part of the V-12 program. However, the Navy leaders kept the teams focus towards the war effort, and USC declined an invitation to the Southern Conference Tournament in 1944.

=== Frank McGuire era (1965–1980) ===
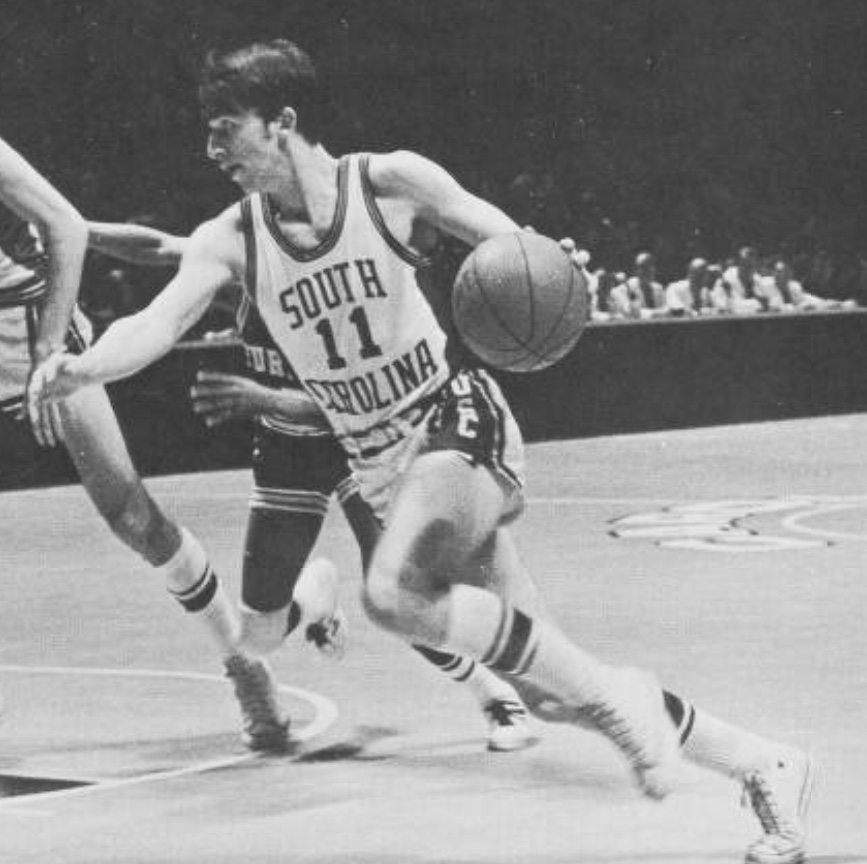
John Roche was twice ACC Player of the Year, in 1969 and 1970.

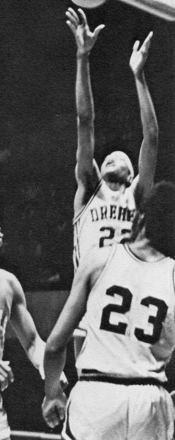
Alex English, a 1975 All-American at South Carolina, would go on to be inducted into the Basketball Hall of Fame.

The hiring of Frank McGuire before the 1964–65 season propelled South Carolina to its most successful period to date. McGuire's 16-year tenure was highlighted by an undefeated ACC regular season in 1970, an ACC Tournament championship in 1971, and three consecutive Sweet 16 appearances from 1971 to 1973. USC also posted a 69–16 overall record from 1968 to 1971, and John Roche won consecutive ACC Player of the Year Awards (1969–1970). In November 1968, the Gamecocks began playing at the 12,401 seat Carolina Coliseum, which became known as the "House that Frank Built." The success South Carolina achieved on the court brought resentment and anger from fellow ACC schools, especially those on "Tobacco Road," as the conference members of the state of North Carolina were known. The hostility of the road crowds, the unfriendly behavior of coaches and athletic directors in the conference, and the discrepancies in eligibility to compete in the NCAA tournament, which at that time was delegated strictly to the winner of the ACC tournament despite that year's championship game being the only Gamecocks loss, led McGuire to support South Carolina becoming an Independent before the 1971–72 season.

As an independent, the program gradually declined, and the university sought entrance into an athletic conference. This proved problematic because most conferences required schools to have a single athletic director, and South Carolina had multiple directors at the time. McGuire served as athletic director for the basketball program, and he would not relinquish his position. The university made several attempts to obtain McGuire's resignation, but ultimately honored his contract through 1980. McGuire finished with a 283–142 overall record at South Carolina and continues to be held in high regard by Gamecock fans. His six consecutive 20-win seasons from 1969 to 1974, which produced a 137–33 record, remain the benchmark for USC Basketball.

=== Metro Conference and SEC ===
In 1983, the university became affiliated with the Metro Conference. The basketball program was placed on probation by the NCAA in the spring of 1987 for two years because of recruiting violations and the sale of complimentary player tickets. From 1987 to 1991, George Felton led the Gamecocks to an 87–62 overall record, which included a 1989 NCAA Tournament appearance and a 1991 NIT berth. For three of Felton's five seasons (1987–1989), Tubby Smith served as an assistant coach before leaving to join Rick Pitino's staff at Kentucky. South Carolina joined the SEC before the 1992 season and initially struggled, posting a combined 20–35 record in 1992 and 1993.

=== Eddie Fogler era (1994–2001) ===
Eddie Fogler was hired away from Vanderbilt before the 1994 season and within a few years returned the Gamecocks to respectability. Under Fogler, South Carolina posted an impressive 66–28 record (34–14 SEC) during the 1996–1998 stretch, which included the school's first SEC championship in 1997. The 1997 Gamecocks posted a 15–1 record in SEC play and defeated league rival Kentucky twice, but lost in the First Round of the NCAA Tournament. Fogler stepped down after the 2001 campaign, going 123–117 in eight seasons as the Gamecocks' head coach. His tenure included two NCAA Tournament appearances (1997, 1998) and two NIT appearances (1996, 2001). Fogler retired as one of the most successful head coaches in SEC Basketball history, having won regular season conference championships at both Vanderbilt and South Carolina.

=== Dave Odom era (2002–2008) ===
Subsequent coach Dave Odom posted four 20-win seasons during his tenure at South Carolina. He led the Gamecocks to an appearance in the 2004 NCAA Tournament and consecutive NIT championships in 2005 and 2006. Odom's tenure also saw USC begin play at the 18,000 seat Colonial Life Arena during the 2002–2003 season. Following the 2007–2008 campaign, Odom resigned with a 128–104 overall record at USC.

=== Darrin Horn era (2009–2012) ===
On April 1, 2008, Darrin Horn was named the new head basketball coach at USC. In his first season, Horn led the Gamecocks to a 21–10 record (10–6 SEC), two victories over Kentucky, and a share of the 2009 SEC Eastern Division title. After a 10–21 campaign in 2011–12, his third straight losing season, Horn was fired on March 13, 2012, finishing his tenure at Carolina with a 60–63 overall record and a 23–45 mark in the SEC.

=== Frank Martin era (2012–2022) ===
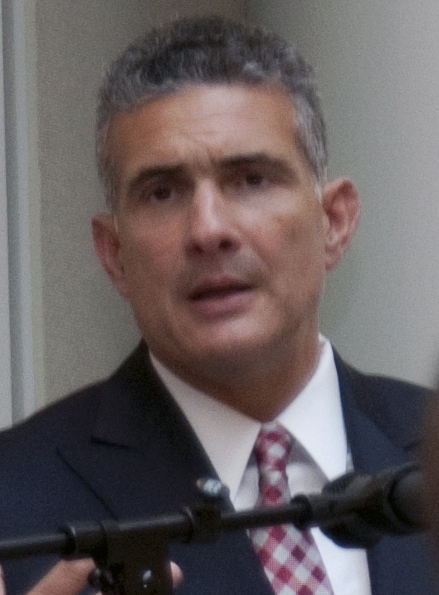
Martin led the Gamecocks to their first Final Four in 2017.

Frank Martin came to USC from Kansas State, where he had enjoyed five winning seasons and four NCAA Tournament appearances, including an Elite Eight appearance with the Wildcats in 2010. After losing records in his first two seasons with the Gamecocks, he achieved a winning season in 2015, then reached the NIT in 2016, and then broke through into the 2017 NCAA Tournament, the program's first appearance in the event since 2004. On March 17, 2017, USC achieved its first NCAA Tournament victory since 1973 with a 20-point win over the Marquette Golden Eagles. Two nights later, the Gamecocks upset the #2 seed Duke Blue Devils to advance to their fourth Sweet 16. South Carolina then beat #3 seed Baylor Bears to advance to their first-ever Elite 8, two days later they upset Florida to advance to their first ever Final Four.

=== Lamont Paris era (2022–present) ===
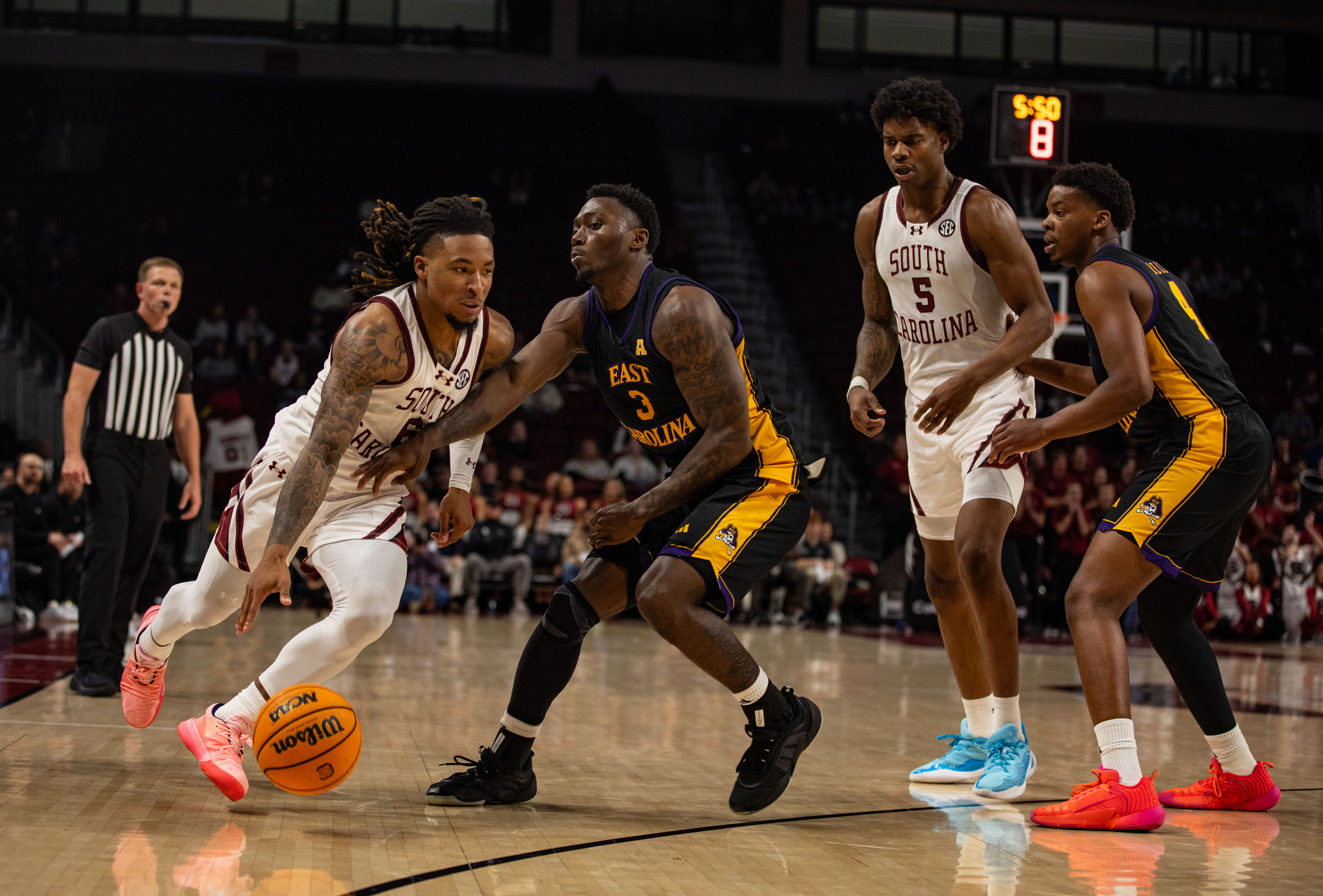
A game between South Carolina and East Carolina at Colonial Life Arena in 2024

Former Chattanooga head coach Lamont Paris was named South Carolina's 33rd head coach on March 24, 2022, to replace the terminated Frank Martin. Paris is the first African-American head coach in the history of the Gamecock men's basketball program.

== Year-by-year results ==
| Season | Coach | Record | | Notes |
|---|---|---|---|---|
| Season | Coach | Overall | Conference | Notes |
Independent
| 1908–1909 | J. H. Brown | 0–3 | — | |
| 1909–1910 | F. E. Schofield | 0–1 | — | |
| 1910–1911 | No coach | 1–1 | — | |
| 1911–1912 | James G. Driver | 3–4 | — | |
| 1912–1913 | James G. Driver | 2–3 | — | |
| 1913–1914 | John Blackburn | 5–4–1 | — | |
| 1914–1915 | L. W. Hill | 2–7 | — | |
Southern Intercollegiate Athletic Association
| 1915–1916 | Charles C. Farrell | 4–6 | — | |
| 1916–1917 | Dixon Foster | 7–8 | — | |
| 1917–1918 | Dixon Foster | 8–5 | — | |
| 1918–1919 | Dixon Foster | 4–7 | — | |
| 1919–1920 | Dixon Foster | 7–11 | — | |
| 1920–1921 | Sol Metzger | 7–11 | — | |
| 1921–1922 | Lana A. Sims | 7–12 | — | |
Southern Conference
| 1922–1923 | Jack Crawford | 6–13 | 0–3 | |
| 1923–1924 | Jack Crawford | 11–9 | 2–2 | |
| 1924–1925 | Branch Bocock | 10–7 | 4–2 | |
| 1925–1926 | Branch Bocock | 9–5 | 4–2 | |
| 1926–1927 | Branch Bocock | 14–4 | 9–1 | SoCon Champions |
| 1927–1928 | A. Burnet Stoney | 8–12 | 4–7 | |
| 1928–1929 | Rock Norman | 8–13 | 4–9 | |
| 1929–1930 | Rock Norman | 6–10 | 0–6 | |
| 1930–1931 | Rock Norman | 1–17 | 1–12 | |
| 1931–1932 | Rock Norman | 9–7 | 2–2 | |
| 1932–1933 | Billy Laval | 17–2 | 4–0 | SoCon Champions; SoCon Tournament Champions |
| 1933–1934 | Rock Norman | 18–1 | 6–0 | SoCon Champions |
| 1934–1935 | Rock Norman | 15–9 | 5–7 | |
| 1935–1936 | Ted Petoskey | 11–8 | 1–6 | |
| 1936–1937 | Ted Petoskey | 13–7 | 8–4 | |
| 1937–1938 | Ted Petoskey | 3–21 | 1–13 | |
| 1938–1939 | Ted Petoskey | 5–18 | 3–8 | |
| 1939–1940 | Ted Petoskey | 5–13 | 3–10 | |
| 1940–1941 | Frank Johnson | 15–9 | 8–3 | |
| 1941–1942 | Frank Johnson | 12–9 | 8–4 | |
| 1942–1943 | Frank Johnson (first 2 games); Rex Enright (last 17 games) | 13–6 | 6–3 | |
| 1943–1944 | Henry Findley | 13–2 | 1–2 | |
| 1944–1945 | John D. McMillan | 19–3 | 9–0 | SoCon Champions |
| 1945–1946 | Dick Anderson (first 12 games); Frank Johnson (last 8 games) | 9–11 | 4–7 | |
| 1946–1947 | Frank Johnson | 16–9 | 7–5 | |
| 1947–1948 | Frank Johnson | 12–11 | 8–7 | |
| 1948–1949 | Frank Johnson | 10–12 | 7–6 | |
| 1949–1950 | Frank Johnson | 13–12 | 5–8 | |
| 1950–1951 | Frank Johnson | 13–12 | 12–7 | |
| 1951–1952 | Frank Johnson | 14–10 | 8–8 | |
| 1952–1953 | Frank Johnson | 11–13 | 7–12 | |
Atlantic Coast Conference
| 1953–1954 | Frank Johnson | 10–16 | 2–7 | |
| 1954–1955 | Frank Johnson | 10–17 | 2–12 | |
| 1955–1956 | Frank Johnson | 9–14 | 3–11 | |
| 1956–1957 | Frank Johnson | 17–12 | 5–9 | |
| 1957–1958 | Frank Johnson | 5–19 | 3–11 | |
| 1958–1959 | Walt Hambrick | 4–20 | 2–12 | |
| 1959–1960 | Bob Stevens | 10–16 | 6–8 | |
| 1960–1961 | Bob Stevens | 9–17 | 2–12 | |
| 1961–1962 | Bob Stevens | 15–12 | 7–7 | |
| 1962–1963 | Chuck Noe | 9–15 | 4–10 | |
| 1963–1964 | Chuck Noe (first 12 games); Dwane Morrison (last 12 games) | 10–14 | 7–7 | |
| 1964–1965 | Frank McGuire | 6–17 | 2–12 | |
| 1965–1966 | Frank McGuire | 11–13 | 4–10 | |
| 1966–1967 | Frank McGuire | 16–7 | 8–4 | |
| 1967–1968 | Frank McGuire | 15–7 | 9–5 | |
| 1968–1969 | Frank McGuire | 21–7 | 11–3 | NIT second round |
| 1969–1970 | Frank McGuire | 25–3 | 14–0 | ACC Regular Season Champions |
| 1970–1971 | Frank McGuire | 23–6 | 10–4 | ACC Champions; NCAA Sweet Sixteen |
Independent
| 1971–1972 | Frank McGuire | 24–5 | — | NCAA Sweet Sixteen |
| 1972–1973 | Frank McGuire | 22–7 | — | NCAA Sweet Sixteen |
| 1973–1974 | Frank McGuire | 22–5 | — | NCAA first round |
| 1974–1975 | Frank McGuire | 19–9 | — | NIT second round |
| 1975–1976 | Frank McGuire | 18–9 | — | |
| 1976–1977 | Frank McGuire | 14–12 | — | |
| 1977–1978 | Frank McGuire | 16–12 | — | NIT first round |
| 1978–1979 | Frank McGuire | 15–12 | — | |
| 1979–1980 | Frank McGuire | 16–11 | — | |
| 1980–1981 | Bill Foster | 17–10 | — | |
| 1981–1982 | Bill Foster | 14–15 | — | |
| 1982–1983 | Bill Foster | 22–9 | — | NIT third round |
Metro Conference
| 1983–1984 | Bill Foster | 12–16 | 5–9 | |
| 1984–1985 | Bill Foster | 15–13 | 6–8 | |
| 1985–1986 | Bill Foster | 12–16 | 2–10 | |
| 1986–1987 | George Felton | 15–14 | 5–7 | |
| 1987–1988 | George Felton | 19–10 | 6–6 | |
| 1988–1989 | George Felton | 19–11 | 8–4 | NCAA first round |
| 1989–1990 | George Felton | 14–14 | 6–8 | |
| 1990–1991 | George Felton | 20–13 | 5–9 | NIT second round |
Southeastern Conference (East Division)
| 1991–1992 | Steve Newton | 11–17 | 3–13 | |
| 1992–1993 | Steve Newton | 9–18 | 5–11 | |
| 1993–1994 | Eddie Fogler | 9–19 | 4–12 | |
| 1994–1995 | Eddie Fogler | 10–17 | 5–11 | |
| 1995–1996 | Eddie Fogler | 19–12 | 8–8 | NIT third round |
| 1996–1997 | Eddie Fogler | 24–8 | 15–1 | SEC Champions; NCAA first round |
| 1997–1998 | Eddie Fogler | 23–8 | 11–5 | NCAA first round |
| 1998–1999 | Eddie Fogler | 8–21 | 3–13 | |
| 1999–2000 | Eddie Fogler | 15–17 | 5–11 | |
| 2000–2001 | Eddie Fogler | 15–15 | 6–10 | NIT first round |
| 2001–2002 | Dave Odom | 22–15 | 6–10 | NIT Runners-up |
| 2002–2003 | Dave Odom | 12–16 | 5–11 | |
| 2003–2004 | Dave Odom | 23–11 | 8–8 | NCAA first round |
| 2004–2005 | Dave Odom | 20–13 | 7–9 | NIT Champions |
| 2005–2006 | Dave Odom | 23–15 | 6–10 | NIT Champions |
| 2006–2007 | Dave Odom | 14–16 | 4–12 | |
| 2007–2008 | Dave Odom | 14–18 | 5–11 | |
| 2008–2009 | Darrin Horn | 21–10 | 10–6 | NIT first round |
| 2009–2010 | Darrin Horn | 15–16 | 6–10 | |
| 2010–2011 | Darrin Horn | 14–16 | 5–11 | |
Southeastern Conference
| 2011–2012 | Darrin Horn | 10–21 | 2–14 | |
| 2012–2013 | Frank Martin | 14–18 | 4–14 | |
| 2013–2014 | Frank Martin | 14–20 | 5–13 | |
| 2014–2015 | Frank Martin | 17–16 | 6–12 | |
| 2015–2016 | Frank Martin | 25–9 | 11–7 | NIT second round |
| 2016–2017 | Frank Martin | 26–11 | 12–6 | NCAA Final Four |
| 2017–2018 | Frank Martin | 17–16 | 7–11 | |
| 2018–2019 | Frank Martin | 16–16 | 11–7 | |
| 2019–2020 | Frank Martin | 18–13 | 10–8 | |
| 2020–2021 | Frank Martin | 6–15 | 4–12 | |
| 2021–2022 | Frank Martin | 18–13 | 9–9 | |
| 2022–2023 | Lamont Paris | 11–20 | 4–14 | |
| 2023–2024 | Lamont Paris | 26–8 | 13–5 | NCAA first round |
| 2024–2025 | Lamont Paris | 12–20 | 2–16 | |
| 2025–2026 | Lamont Paris | 10–7 | 1–3 | |

== Postseason ==
=== NCAA tournament results ===
The Gamecocks have appeared in the NCAA tournament 10 times. Their combined record is 8–11.

| Year | Seed | Round | Opponent | Result |
|---|---|---|---|---|
| 1971 | | Second Round; Regional 3rd Place Game | Penn; Fordham | L 64–79; L 90–100 |
| 1972 | | Round of 25; Second Round; Regional 3rd Place Game | Temple; North Carolina; Villanova | W 53–51; L 62–92; W 90–78 |
| 1973 | | Round of 25; Second Round; Regional 3rd Place Game | Texas Tech; Memphis State; Southwestern Louisiana | W 78–70; L 76–90; W 90–85 |
| 1974 | | Round of 25 | Furman | L 67–75 |
| 1989 | (12) | Round of 64 | (5) NC State | L 66–81 |
| 1997 | (2) | Round of 64 | (15) Coppin State | L 65–78 |
| 1998 | (3) | Round of 64 | (14) Richmond | L 61–62 |
| 2004 | (10) | Round of 64 | (7) Memphis | L 43–59 |
| 2017 | (7) | Round of 64; Round of 32; Sweet Sixteen; Elite Eight; Final Four | (10) Marquette (2) Duke (3) Baylor (4) Florida (1) Gonzaga | W 93–73; W 88–81; W 70–50; W 77–70; L 73–77 |
| 2024 | #6 | Round of 64 | #11 Oregon | L 73–87 |

=== NIT results ===
The Gamecocks have appeared in the National Invitation Tournament (NIT) 12 times. Their combined record is 22–10. They were NIT champions in 2005 and 2006.

| Year | Seed | Round | Opponent | Result |
|---|---|---|---|---|
| 1969 | | First Round; Quarterfinals | Southern Illinois; Army | W 72–63; L 45–59 |
| 1975 | | First Round; Quarterfinals | Connecticut; Princeton | W 71–61; L 67–86 |
| 1978 | | First Round | NC State | L 70–83 |
| 1983 | | First Round; Second Round; Quarterfinals | Old Dominion; Virginia Tech; Wake Forest | W 100–90; W 76–75; L 61–78 |
| 1991 | | First Round; Second Round | George Washington; Siena | W 69–63; L 58–63 |
| 1996 | | First Round; Second Round; Quarterfinals | Davidson; Vanderbilt; Alabama | W 100–73; W 80–70; L 67–68 |
| 2001 | | First Round | Connecticut | L 65–72 |
| 2002 | | First Round; Second Round; Quarterfinals; Semifinals; Finals | Virginia; UNLV; Ball State; Syracuse; Memphis | W 74–67; W 75–65; W 82–47; W 66–59; L 62–72 |
| 2005 | | First Round; Second Round; Quarterfinals; Semifinals; Finals | Miami (FL); UNLV; Georgetown; Maryland; Saint Joseph's | W 69–67; W 77–66; W 69–66; W 75–67; W 60–57 |
| 2006 | #3 | First Round; Second Round; Quarterfinals; Semifinals; Finals | #6 Western Kentucky #2 Florida State #1 Cincinnati #1 Louisville #1 Michigan | W 74–55; W 69–68; W 65–62; W 78–63; W 76–64 |
| 2009 | #3 | First Round | #6 Davidson | L 63–70 |
| 2016 | #1 | First Round; Second Round | #8 High Point #4 Georgia Tech | W 88–66; L 66–83 |

== Conference championships ==
- 1927 SoCon (season) – South Carolina went 14–4 overall and 9–1 in Southern Conference play.
- 1933 SoCon (season & tournament) – South Carolina posted a 17–2 record (4–1 SoCon) and won the Southern Conference tournament.
- 1934 SoCon (season) – South Carolina went 18–1 overall and 6–0 in Southern Conference play.
- 1945 SoCon (season) – South Carolina went 19–3 overall and 9–0 in Southern Conference play.
- 1970 ACC (season) – South Carolina went 25–3 overall and 14–0 in ACC play.
- 1971 ACC (tournament) – South Carolina posted a 23–6 overall record and defeated North Carolina for the ACC Tournament title.
- 1997 SEC (season & division) – South Carolina posted a 24–8 record (15–1 SEC) to win the SEC championship and Eastern Division title.
- 2009 SEC East (division) – South Carolina went 21–10 overall and 10–6 in SEC play to win a share of the SEC East title.

== Head coaches ==
| Name | Years | Seasons | Won | Lost | Pct. |
|---|---|---|---|---|---|
| John Hertz Brown | 1908–1909 | 1 | 0 | 3 | .000 |
| F. E. Schofield | 1909–1910 | 1 | 0 | 1 | .000 |
| No coach | 1910–1911 | 1 | 1 | 1 | .500 |
| James G. Driver | 1911–1913 | 2 | 5 | 7 | .417 |
| John Blackburn | 1913–1914 | 1 | 5 | 4 | .550 |
| L. W. Hill | 1914–1915 | 1 | 2 | 7 | .286 |
| Charles C. Farrell | 1915–1916 | 1 | 4 | 6 | .400 |
| Dixon Foster | 1916–1920 | 4 | 26 | 31 | .456 |
| Sol Metzger | 1920–1921 | 1 | 7 | 11 | .389 |
| Lana A. Sims | 1921–1922 | 1 | 7 | 12 | .368 |
| Jack Crawford | 1922–1924 | 2 | 17 | 22 | .436 |
| Branch Bocock | 1924–1927 | 3 | 33 | 16 | .673 |
| A. Burnet Stoney | 1927–1928 | 1 | 8 | 12 | .400 |
| Rock Norman | 1928–1932; 1933–1935 | 6 | 57 | 57 | .500 |
| Billy Laval | 1932–1933 | 1 | 17 | 2 | .895 |
| Ted Petoskey | 1935–1940 | 5 | 37 | 67 | .354 |
| Frank Johnson | 1940–1943; 1946–1958 | 14.5 | 174 | 175 | .499 |
| Rex Enright | 1943 | 1 | 11 | 6 | .647 |
| Henry Findley | 1943–1944 | 1 | 13 | 2 | .867 |
| Johnny McMillan | 1944–1945 | 1 | 19 | 3 | .864 |
| Dick Anderson | 1945–1946 | 0.5 | 4 | 8 | .333 |
| Walt Hambrick | 1958–1959 | 1 | 4 | 20 | .167 |
| Bob Stevens | 1959–1962 | 3 | 34 | 45 | .430 |
| Chuck Noe | 1962–1963 | 1.5 | 16 | 21 | .417 |
| Dwane Morrison | 1964 | 0.5 | 4 | 8 | .333 |
| Frank McGuire | 1964–1980 | 16 | 283 | 142 | .666 |
| Bill Foster | 1980–1986 | 6 | 92 | 79 | .538 |
| George Felton | 1986–1991 | 5 | 87 | 62 | .584 |
| Steve Newton | 1991–1993 | 2 | 20 | 35 | .364 |
| Eddie Fogler | 1993–2001 | 8 | 123 | 117 | .513 |
| Dave Odom | 2001–2008 | 7 | 128 | 104 | .552 |
| Darrin Horn | 2008–2012 | 4 | 60 | 63 | .488 |
| Frank Martin | 2012–2022 | 10 | 171 | 147 | .538 |
| Lamont Paris | 2022–present | 2 | 37 | 29 | .561 |

== All-Americans ==
| Player | Position | Year(s) | electors |
|---|---|---|---|
| Freddie Thompkins | | 1934 | Converse Yearbook |
| Jim Slaughter | Center | 1951 | Helms Athletic Foundation, Associated Press |
| Grady Wallace | Forward | 1957 | Helms Athletic Foundation, Associated Press, Converse Yearbook, UPI, International News Service |
| Skip Harlicka | Guard | 1968 | Converse Yearbook |
| John Roche (3) | Guard | 1969, 1970, 1971 | United Savings Helms Athletic Foundation, Associated Press, Converse Yearbook, UPI, Basketball Weekly, Look Magazine, The Sporting News, NABC, NBA Coaches |
| Tom Riker | Forward | 1972 | National Association of Basketball Writers, United Savings Helms Athletic Foundation, Associated Press, UPI, The Sporting News, NABC |
| Kevin Joyce | Guard | 1973 | United Savings Helms Athletic Foundation, Associated Press, UPI, NABC |
| Brian Winters | Guard/Forward | 1974 | Citizen Savings Athletic Foundation |
| Alex English | Forward | 1975 | Citizen Savings Athletic Foundation, Independent All-America |
| Zam Fredrick | Guard | 1981 | Citizen Savings Athletic Foundation |
| Larry Davis | Guard | 1997 | Basketball Weekly, Associated Press |
| Melvin Watson | Guard | 1997 | Associated Press |
| BJ McKie (3) | Guard | 1997, 1998, 1999 | Basketball Weekly, Associated Press |
| Devan Downey (2) | Guard | 2009, 2010 | Associated Press, The Sporting News |
Source: South Carolina Media Guide

== Awards ==
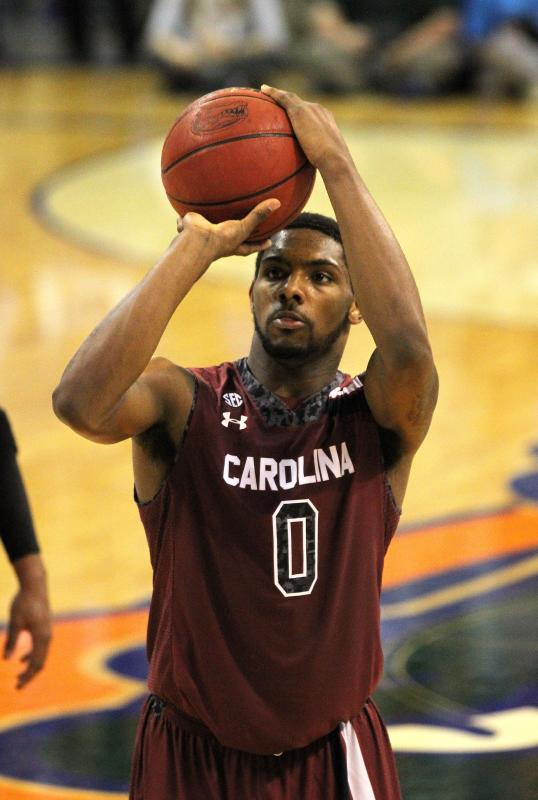
Sindarius Thornwell became the Gamecocks' first SEC Player of the Year in 2017.

National Scoring Leader

- Grady Wallace – 1957 (31.3 ppg)
- Zam Fredrick – 1981 (28.9 ppg)

ACC Player of the Year

- John Roche – 1969, 1970

All-ACC First Team

- Grady Wallace – 1957
- Art Whisnant – 1962
- Ronnie Collins – 1964
- Skip Harlicka – 1968
- John Roche – 1969, 1970, 1971
- Tom Owens – 1970, 1971

All-ACC Second Team

- Grady Wallace – 1956
- Art Whisnant – 1960, 1961
- Scott Ward – 1963
- Gary Gregor – 1967, 1968
- Jack Thompson – 1967
- Frank Standard – 1968
- Tom Owens – 1969

ACC Tournament Outstanding Player

- John Roche – 1971

Metro Conference Newcomer of the Year

- Linwood Moye – 1985

All-Metro First Team

- Jimmy Foster – 1984

All-Metro Second Team

- Linwood Moye – 1986
- Michael Foster – 1987
- Darryl Martin – 1987
- John Hudson – 1988, 1989
- Jo Jo English – 1991

SEC Player of the Year

- Sindarius Thornwell – 2017

SEC Rookie of the Year

- BJ McKie – 1996

SEC Coach of the Year

- Dave Odom – 2004
- Lamont Paris - 2024

SEC Defensive Player of the Year

- Sam Muldrow – 2011
- Chris Silva – 2018

SEC Sixth Man of the Year

- Brandis Raley-Ross – 2009
- Duane Notice – 2016
- Hassani Gravett – 2019

All-SEC First Team

- Larry Davis – 1997
- BJ McKie – 1997, 1998, 1999
- Tre' Kelley – 2007
- Devan Downey – 2008, 2009, 2010
- Michael Carrera – 2016
- Sindarius Thornwell – 2017
- Chris Silva – 2018

All-SEC Second Team

- Jamie Watson – 1993, 1994
- Larry Davis – 1996
- Melvin Watson – 1997, 1998
- Tarence Kinsey – 2006
- Dominique Archie – 2009
- Zam Fredrick Jr. – 2009
- Meechie Johnson - 2024
- Ta'Lon Cooper - 2024

All-SEC Third Team

- Emmitt Hall – 1993, 1994
- Melvin Watson – 1996
- Marijonas Petravičius – 2001
- Jamel Bradley – 2002
- Carlos Powell – 2004, 2005
- Brandon Wallace – 2007

NIT Most Valuable Player

- Carlos Powell – 2005
- Renaldo Balkman – 2006

== Gamecocks in the NBA ==
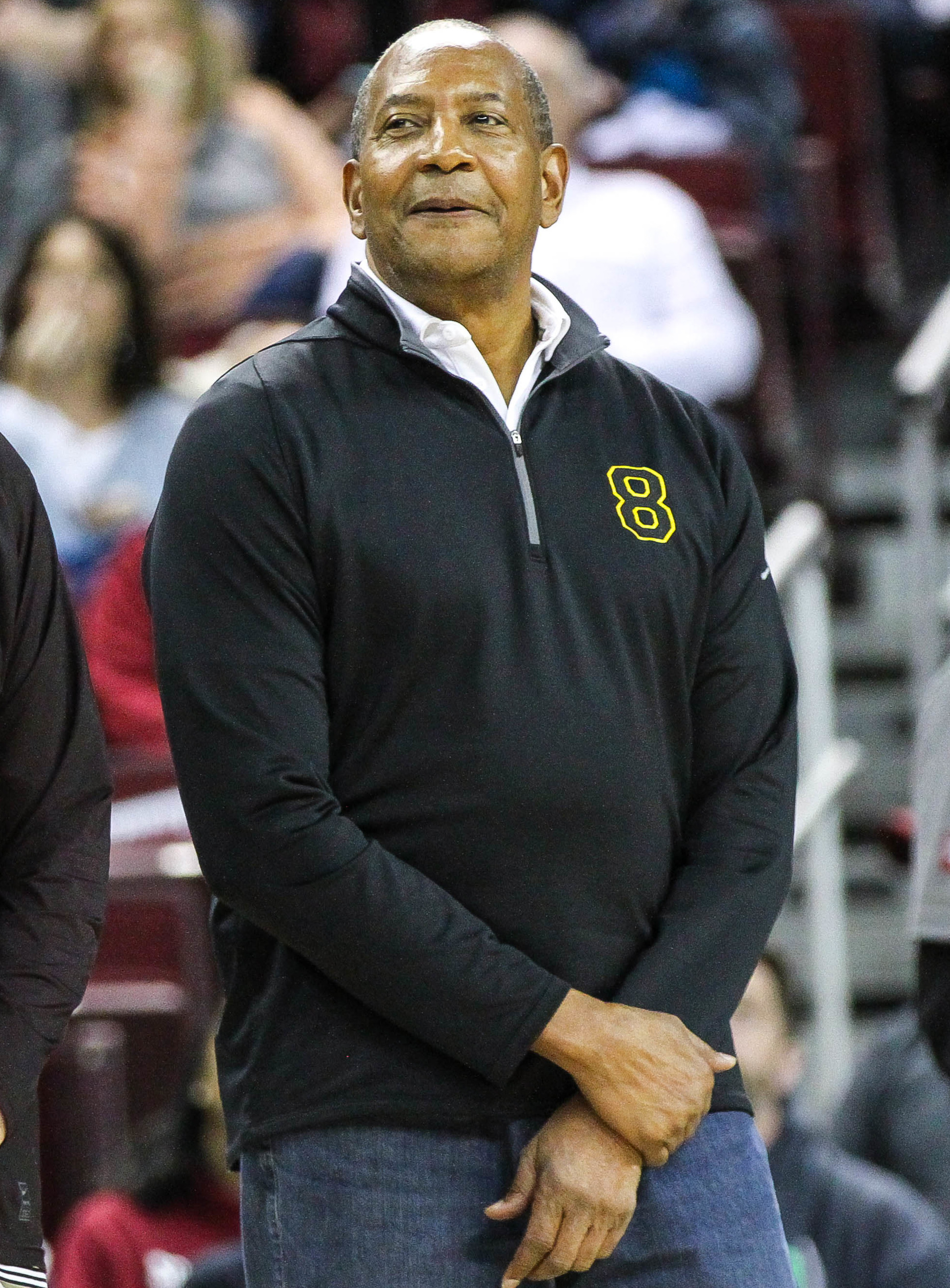
Alex English was the NBA's leading scorer of the 1980s

- Jim Slaughter – drafted 31st overall in the 1951 NBA draft by the Atlanta Hawks, retired
- Jim Fox – drafted 67th overall in the 1965 NBA draft to the Cincinnati Kings, retired
- Gary Gregor – drafted 8th overall in the 1968 NBA draft to the Phoenix Suns, retired
- Skip Harlicka – drafted 13th overall in the 1968 NBA draft to the Atlanta Hawks
- John Roche – drafted 14th overall in the 1971 NBA draft to the Phoenix Suns, retired
- Tom Owens – drafted 58th overall in the 1971 NBA draft by the Houston Rockets, retired
- Tom Riker – drafted 8th overall in the 1972 NBA draft by the New York Knicks, retired
- Kevin Joyce – drafted 11th overall in the 1973 NBA draft to the Golden State Warriors, retired
- Brian Winters – drafted 12th overall in the 1974 NBA draft to the Los Angeles Lakers
- Tom Boswell – drafted 17th overall in the 1975 NBA draft to the Boston Celtics, retired
- Alex English – drafted 23rd overall in the 1976 NBA draft by the Milwaukee Bucks, member of the Basketball Hall of Fame, 8x All-Star, accumulated a career total of 25,613 points, 6,538 rebounds, and 4,351 assists
- Mike Dunleavy Sr. – drafted 99th overall in the 1976 NBA draft to the Philadelphia 76ers Former head coach of the Los Angeles Clippers
- Cedrick Hordges – drafted 49th overall in the 1979 NBA draft by the Chicago Bulls, retired
- Mike Brittain – drafted 29th overall in the 1985 NBA draft by the San Antonio Spurs, retired
- Jo Jo English – undrafted 1992 NBA draft, signed with Chicago Bulls, retired
- Jamie Watson – drafted 47th overall in the 1996 NBA draft by the Utah Jazz, Sacramento Kings, Dallas Mavericks, and Miami Heat, retired
- Ryan Stack – drafted 48th overall in the 1998 NBA draft to the Cleveland Cavaliers, retired
- Renaldo Balkman – drafted 20th overall in the 2006 NBA draft to the New York Knicks, retired
- Tarence Kinsey – undrafted in the 2006 NBA draft, signed with Memphis Grizzlies, retired
- Sindarius Thornwell – drafted 48th overall in the 2017 NBA draft by the Los Angeles Clippers
- PJ Dozier – undrafted in the 2017 NBA draft, signed with the Oklahoma City Thunder, currently with the Denver Nuggets
- Chris Silva – undrafted in the 2019 NBA draft, signed with Miami Heat, currently with Bnei Herzliya
- Hassani Gravett – undrafted in the 2019 NBA draft, signed with Orlando Magic, currently with Sabah BC
- Brian Bowen II – undrafted in the 2019 NBA draft, signed with Indiana Pacers, currently with the Stockton Kings
- A.J. Lawson – undrafted in the 2021 NBA draft, signed with Atlanta Hawks, currently with the Long Island Nets
- GG Jackson – drafted 45th overall in the 2023 NBA draft by the Memphis Grizzlies
- Collin Murray-Boyles – drafted 9th overall in the 2025 NBA draft by the Toronto Raptors

== Retired numbers ==
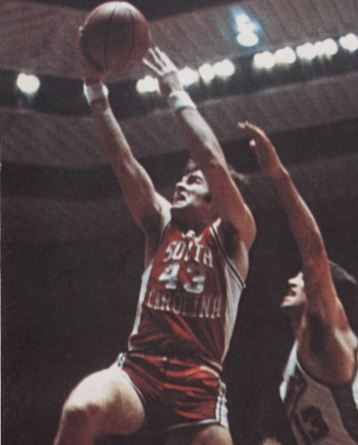
Kevin Joyce as a junior at South Carolina

South Carolina has retired five jersey numbers.

South Carolina Gamecocks retired numbers
| No. | Player | Position | Tenure | Ref. |
| 3 | BJ McKie | PG | 1995–1999 | |
| 11 | John Roche | PG | 1968–1971 | |
| 22 | Alex English | SF | 1972–1976 | |
| 42 | Grady Wallace | F | 1955–1957 | |
| 43 | Kevin Joyce | PG / SG | 1970–1973 | |

== See also ==
- Basketball in the United States
- College basketball
