= List of Kentucky Wildcats men's basketball honorees =

A number of Kentucky Wildcats men's basketball players have been honored with various Southeastern Conference and national awards.

== Banner honorees ==
Forty-three former Kentucky men's basketball players, coaches, and contributors are honored in Rupp Arena with banners representing their numbers hung from the rafters. With the streamlining of jersey numbers by the NCAA, the jerseys are retired but the numbers remain active. To have a banner hung, the athlete must be elected to the UK Athletics Hall of Fame.

| No. | Name | Years | Note |
|---|---|---|---|
| 22 | Cliff Barker | 1947–49 | 1948 NCAA Champion, 1949 NCAA Champion, One of the Fabulous Five |
| 12 | Ralph Beard | 1946–49 | 1948 NCAA Champion, 1949 NCAA Champion, One of the Fabulous Five |
| 22 | Jerry Bird | 1954–56 | |
| 50 | Bob Burrow | 1955–56 | 1956 Second Team All-America |
| 56 | Burgess Carey | 1925–26 | |
| 24 | Johnny Cox | 1957–59 | 1958 NCAA Champion, 1959 First Team All-America |
| 10 | Louie Dampier | 1965–67 | 1967 Second Team All-America |
| 7 | John DeMoisey | 1932–34 | |
| 00 | Tony Delk | 1993–96 | 1996 NCAA Champion, 1996 First Team All-America, 1996 SEC Player of the Year, 1996 NCAA Tournament M.O.P. |
| 42 | Bill Evans | 1952–55 | |
| 32 | Richie Farmer | 1989–92 | One of the Unforgettables |
| 12 | Deron Feldhaus | 1989–92 | One of the Unforgettables |
| 21 | Jack Givens | 1975–78 | 1978 NCAA Champion, 1978 Second Team All-America, 1978 SEC Player of the Year, 1978 NCAA Tournament M.O.P. |
| 44 | Phil Grawemeyer | 1954–56 | |
| 15 | Alex Groza | 1945–49 | 1948 NCAA Champion, 1949 NCAA Champion, One of the Fabulous Five |
| 35 | Kevin Grevey | 1973–75 | 1975 First Team All-America, 1973 and 1975 SEC Player of the Year |
| – | Joe B. Hall | 1973–85 | 1978 National Championship Head Coach |
| 6 | Cliff Hagan | 1951–54 | 1951 NCAA Champion, 1952 First Team All-America, 1954 First Team All-America |
| 52 | Vernon Hatton | 1956–58 | 1958 NCAA Champion |
| – | Basil Hayden | 1920–22 | |
| 44 | Dan Issel | 1968–70 | UK All-time leading scorer, 1970 First Team All-America |
| 27 | Wallace Jones | 1946–49 | 1948 NCAA Champion, 1949 NCAA Champion, One of the Fabulous Five |
| – | Bill Keightley | 1962–2008 | Mr. Wildcat, Equipment Manager |
| – | Cawood Ledford | 1953–92 | Voice of the Wildcats |
| 4 | Kyle Macy | 1978–80 | 1978 NCAA Champion, 1980 First Team All-America, 1980 SEC Player of the Year |
| 44 | Cotton Nash | 1962–64 | 1964 First Team All-America |
| 24 | Jamal Mashburn | 1991–93 | 1993 First Team All-America, 1993 SEC Player of the Year |
| 34 | John Pelphrey | 1989–92 | One of the Unforgettables |
| 22 | Mike Pratt | 1967–70 | 1970 Second Team All-America |
| – | Rick Pitino | 1990–97 | 1996 National Championship Head Coach |
| 30 | Frank Ramsey | 1951–54 | 1951 NCAA Champion, 1954 Second Team All-America |
| 26 | Kenny Rollins | 1943–48 | 1948 NCAA Champion |
| 42 | Pat Riley | 1965–67 | 1966 First Team All-America, 1966 SEC Player of the Year |
| 53 | Rick Robey | 1975–78 | 1978 NCAA Champion, 1978 Second Team All-America |
| 4 | Layton Rouse | 1938–40 | |
| – | Adolph Rupp | 1931–72 | 1948, 1949, 1951, 1958 National Championship Head Coach |
| – | Forest Sale | 1931–33 | Helms POY 1933, 2 time all American 1932 and 1933 |
| – | Carey Spicer | 1929–31 | |
| 77 | Bill Spivey | 1950–51 | 1951 NCAA Champion, 1951 First Team All-America |
| 20 | Gayle Rose | 1953–55 | |
| 16 | Lou Tsioropoulos | 1951–54 | 1951 NCAA Champion |
| 34 | Kenny Walker | 1983–86 | 1986 First Team All-America, 1985–86 SEC Player of the Year |
| 11 | Sean Woods | 1990–92 | One of the Unforgettables |

== National Players of the Year ==
The UK players listed here received at least one NCAA-recognized national player of the year award.

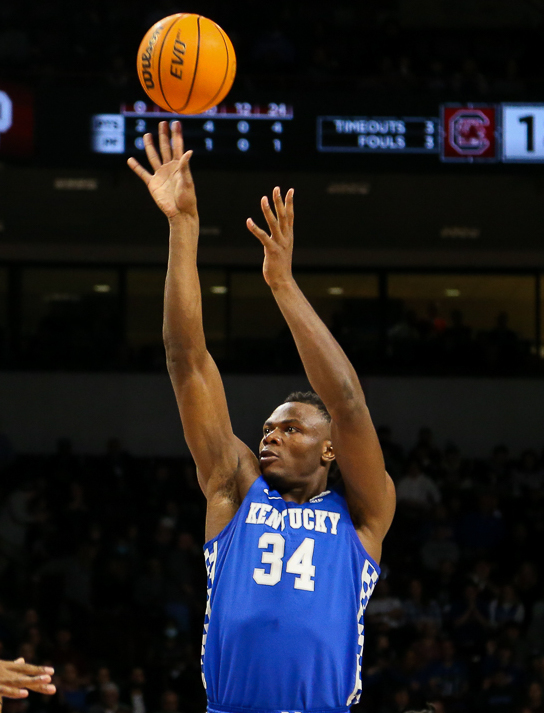
Oscar Tshiebwe is the first UK player to receive all of the NCAA-recognized national player of the year awards in a single season, doing so in 2021–22.

| Year | Player | Award(s) |
|---|---|---|
| 1933 | Forest Sale | Helms Athletic Foundation |
| 1935 | LeRoy Edwards | Helms Athletic Foundation |
| 2010 | John Wall | Adolph Rupp Trophy |
| 2012 | Anthony Davis | Wooden Award; Naismith Trophy; Oscar Robertson Trophy; AP Player of the Year |
| 2022 | Oscar Tshiebwe | Wooden Award; Naismith Trophy; AP Player of the Year; NABC Player of the Year; Sporting News Player of the Year; Oscar Robertson Trophy |

== Kareem Abdul-Jabbar Award ==
The Kareem Abdul-Jabbar Award has been presented by the Naismith Memorial Basketball Hall of Fame since 2015 to the top Division I center.

| Year | Player |
|---|---|
| 2022 | Oscar Tshiebwe |

== All-Americans ==
The following is a list of Kentucky Wildcats men's basketball players that were named First or Second Team All-Americans:

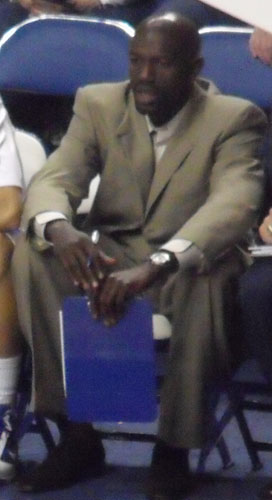
Tony Delk was a Consensus First Team All-America selection in 1995–96.

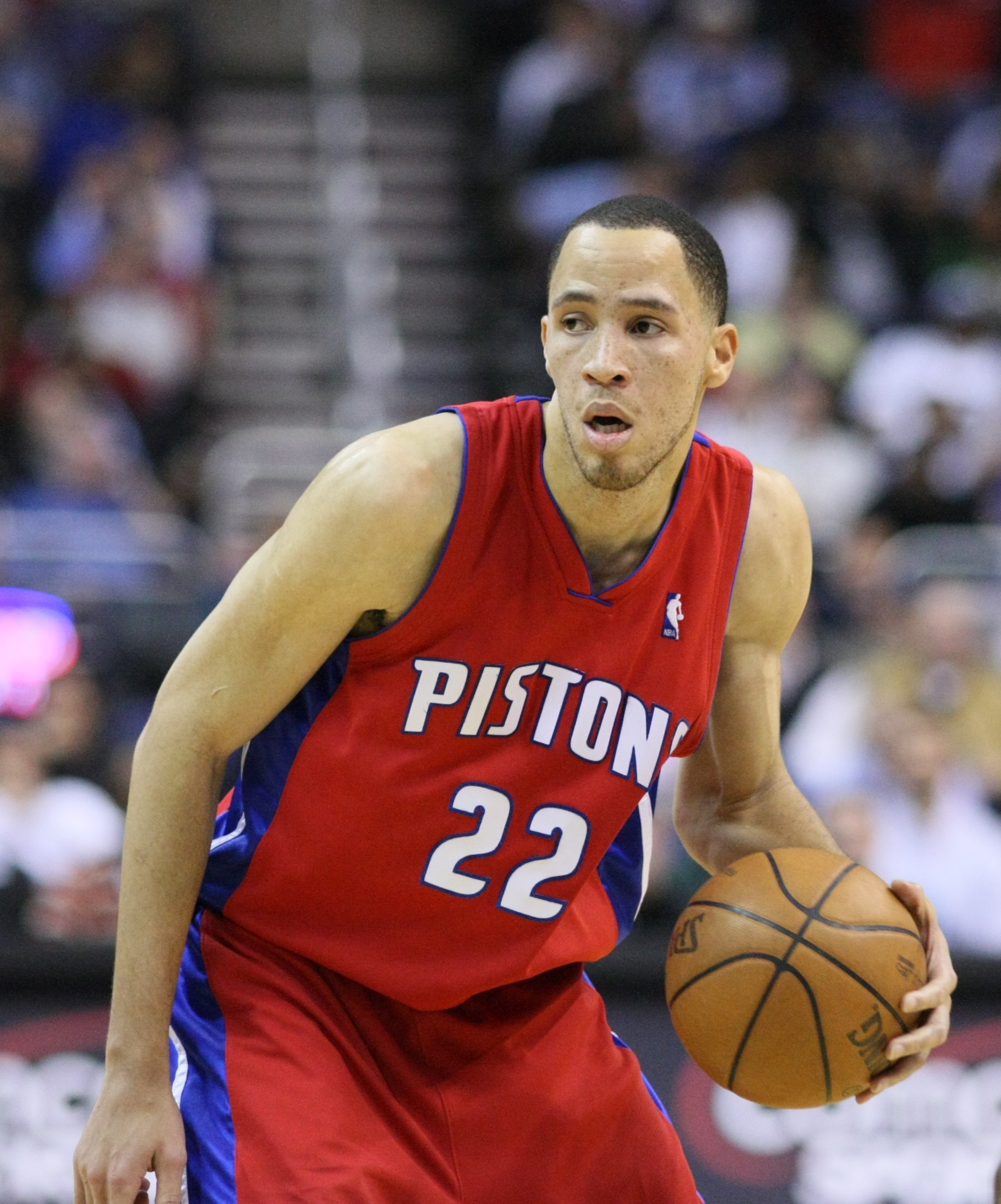
Tayshaun Prince was a Consensus First Team All-America selection in 2001 and 2002.

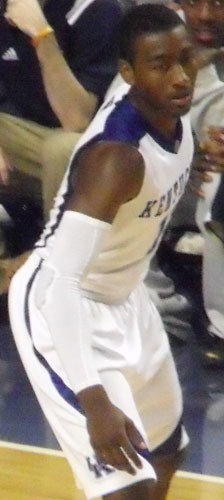
John Wall was a Consensus First Team All-America selection in 2009–10.

| Year | Player | Position |
|---|---|---|
| 1921 | Basil Hayden | Forward |
| 1925 | Burgess Carey | Forward |
| 1929 | Carey Spicer | Forward |
| 1930 | Paul McBrayer | Forward |
| 1931 | Carey Spicer | Forward |
| 1932 | Forest Sale | Center |
| 1933 | Ellis Johnson | Guard |
| 1933 | Forest Sale | Center |
| 1934 | John DeMoisey | Forward |
| 1935 | LeRoy Edwards | Center |
| 1939 | Bernard Opper | Guard |
| 1941 | Lee Huber | Guard |
| 1944 | Bob Brannum | Forward |
| 1946 | Jack Parkinson | Guard |
| 1947 | Ralph Beard | Guard |
| 1947 | Alex Groza | Center |
| 1948 | Ralph Beard | Guard |
| 1948 | Alex Groza | Center |
| 1949 | Ralph Beard | Guard |
| 1949 | Alex Groza | Center |
| 1949 | Wallace "Wah Wah" Jones | Center |
| 1951 | Bill Spivey | Center |
| 1952 | Cliff Hagan | Center |
| 1952 | Frank Ramsey | Guard |
| 1954 | Cliff Hagan | Center |
| 1954 | Frank Ramsey | Guard |
| 1956 | Bob Burrow | Forward |
| 1958 | Vernon Hatton | Guard |
| 1959 | Johnny Cox | Forward |
| 1962 | Cotton Nash | Forward |
| 1963 | Cotton Nash | Forward |
| 1964 | Cotton Nash | Forward |
| 1966 | Louie Dampier | Guard |
| 1966 | Pat Riley | Forward |
| 1967 | Louie Dampier | Guard |
| 1969 | Dan Issel | Forward |
| 1970 | Dan Issel | Forward |
| 1975 | Kevin Grevey | Guard |
| 1974 | Kevin Grevey | Guard |
| 1975 | Kevin Grevey | Guard |
| 1976 | Jack "Goose" Givens | Forward |
| 1977 | Jack "Goose" Givens | Forward |
| 1977 | Rick Robey | Center |
| 1978 | Jack "Goose" Givens | Forward |
| 1978 | Rick Robey | Center |
| 1980 | Kyle Macy | Guard |
| 1981 | Sam Bowie | Center |
| 1984 | Melvin Turpin | Forward |
| 1985 | Kenny "Sky" Walker | Forward |
| 1986 | Kenny "Sky" Walker | Forward |
| 1992 | Jamal Mashburn | Forward |
| 1993 | Jamal Mashburn | Forward |
| 1996 | Tony Delk | Guard |
| 1997 | Ron Mercer | Forward |
| 1998 | Scott Padgett | Forward |
| 2001 | Tayshaun Prince | Forward |
| 2002 | Tayshaun Prince | Forward |
| 2003 | Keith Bogans | Guard |
| 2009 | Jodie Meeks | Guard |
| 2010 | DeMarcus Cousins | Center |
| 2010 | John Wall | Guard |
| 2012 | Anthony Davis | Center |
| 2012 | Michael Kidd-Gilchrist | Forward |
| 2015 | Willie Cauley-Stein | Forward/Center |
| 2015 | Karl-Anthony Towns | Center |
| 2016 | Tyler Ulis | Guard |
| 2017 | Malik Monk | Guard |
| 2022 | Oscar Tshiebwe | Forward/Center |
| 2023 | Oscar Tshiebwe | Forward/Center |

== Wayman Tisdale Award ==
The Wayman Tisdale Award, known before the 2010–11 season as the USBWA National Freshman of the Year Award, has been presented by the United States Basketball Writers Association since 1989 to the top freshman in Division I men's basketball.

| Year | Player |
|---|---|
| 2010 | John Wall |
| 2012 | Anthony Davis |
| 2024 | Reed Sheppard |

== NABC Freshman of the Year ==
The National Association of Basketball Coaches, the trade organization for college men's basketball coaches, has presented its own Freshman of the Year award since the 2016–17 season.

| Year | Player |
|---|---|
| 2024 | Reed Sheppard |

== SEC Player of the Year (AP, UPI, Coaches) ==
The following is a list of Kentucky Wildcats men's basketball players who have been named SEC Player of the Year:

| Year | Player | Position |
|---|---|---|
| 1966 | Pat Riley | Forward |
| 1972 | Tom Parker | Forward |
| 1973 | Kevin Grevey | Guard |
| 1975 | Kevin Grevey | Guard |
| 1980 | Kyle Macy | Guard |
| 1985 | Kenny "Sky" Walker | Forward |
| 1986 | Kenny "Sky" Walker | Forward |
| 1993 | Jamal Mashburn | Forward |
| 1996 | Tony Delk | Guard |
| 1997 | Ron Mercer | Forward |
| 2001 | Tayshaun Prince | Forward |
| 2003 | Keith Bogans | Guard |
| 2010 | John Wall | Guard |
| 2012 | Anthony Davis | Center |
| 2016 | Tyler Ulis | Guard |
| 2017 | Malik Monk | Guard |
| 2020 | Immanuel Quickley | Guard |
| 2022 | Oscar Tshiebwe | Center |

== SEC Freshmen of the Year (AP, Coaches) ==
The following is a list of Kentucky Wildcats men's basketball players who have been named either SEC Freshman of the Year (awarded by the league's head coaches, and open only to freshmen) or SEC Newcomer of the Year (awarded by the AP and open to any player in his first year at an SEC school, including transfers).

All listed players won both awards except for the following:

- Patrick Patterson, a freshman who won the 2008 coaches' award while Nick Calathes of Florida, also a freshman, won the AP award.
- Nerlens Noel, a freshman who won the 2013 coaches' award while junior college transfer Marshall Henderson of Ole Miss won the AP award.
- Reed Sheppard, a freshman who won the 2024 coaches' award while graduate transfer Dalton Knecht of Tennessee won the AP award (as well as both the coaches' and AP versions of the Player of the Year award).

| Year | Player | Position |
|---|---|---|
| 2008 | Patrick Patterson | Forward |
| 2010 | DeMarcus Cousins | Center |
| 2011 | Terrence Jones | Forward |
| 2012 | Anthony Davis | Center |
| 2013 | Nerlens Noel | Center |
| 2014 | Julius Randle | Forward |
| 2015 | Karl-Anthony Towns | Center |
| 2017 | Malik Monk | Guard |
| 2024 | Reed Sheppard | Guard |

== Elite 90 Award ==
One of the NCAA's main student-athlete awards is the Elite 90 Award (previously the Elite 88 and Elite 89), presented at the site of each of the NCAA's 90 annual championship finals. In Division I men's basketball, eligible individuals are those on the playing squads of all Final Four participants who have played at least two seasons at their current school. The recipient is the eligible player with the highest grade point average, with completed credit hours as a tiebreaker if needed.

| Year | Player | Class | Position |
|---|---|---|---|
| 2014 | Sam Malone | Junior | Guard |

== McDonald's All-Americans ==
The following is a list of Kentucky Wildcats men's basketball players who have been named McDonald's All-Americans during their prep careers:

| Year | Player | Position | Hometown (High School) |
|---|---|---|---|
| 1978 | Dwight Anderson | Forward | Dayton, OH (Roth) |
| 1978 | Clarence Tillman | Forward | Philadelphia, PA (West Philadelphia) |
| 1978 | Chuck Verderber | Forward | Lincoln, IL (Lincoln) |
| 1979 | Sam Bowie | Center | Lebanon, PA (Lebanon) |
| 1979 | Derrick Hord | Guard | Bristol, TN (Tennessee) |
| 1979 | Dirk Minniefield | Guard | Lexington, KY (Lafayette) |
| 1980 | Bret Bearup | Center | Greenlawn, NY (Harborfields) |
| 1980 | Jim Master | Guard | Fort Wayne, IN (Paul Harding) |
| 1982 | Roger Harden | Guard | Valparaiso, IN (Valparaiso) |
| 1982 | Kenny "Sky" Walker | Forward | Roberta, GA (Crawford County Comprehensive) |
| 1983 | Winston Bennett | Forward | Louisville, KY (Male) |
| 1983 | James Blackmon | Guard | Marion, IN (Marion) |
| 1984 | Ed Davender | Guard | Brooklyn, NY (Boys and Girls) |
| 1984 | Cedric Jenkins | Center | Dawson, GA (Terrell County) |
| 1984 | Richard Madison | Forward | Memphis, TN (Northside) |
| 1985 | Irving Thomas | Forward | Miami, FL (Carol City) |
| 1986 | Rex Chapman | Guard | Owensboro, KY (Apollo) |
| 1987 | Eric Manuel | Guard | Macon, GA (Southwest) |
| 1988 | Chris Mills | Forward | Los Angeles, CA (Fairfax) |
| 1992 | Tony Delk | Guard | Brownsville, TN (Haywood) |
| 1992 | Rodrick Rhodes | Forward | Jersey City, NJ (St. Anthony's) |
| 1994 | Antoine Walker | Forward | Chicago, IL (Mt. Carmel) |
| 1995 | Ron Mercer | Forward | Nashville, TN (Goodpasture School) |
| 1995 | Wayne Turner | Guard | Boston, MA (Beaver Country Day) |
| 1998 | Tayshaun Prince | Forward | Compton, CA (Dominguez) |
| 1999 | Keith Bogans | Guard | Alexandria, VA (DeMatha) |
| 1999 | Marvin Stone | Center | Huntsville, AL (Grissom) |
| 2001 | Rashad Carruth | Guard | College Park, GA (Oak Hill) |
| 2004 | Joe Crawford | Guard | Detroit, MI (Renaissance) |
| 2004 | Randolph Morris | Center | Atlanta, GA (Landmark Christian) |
| 2004 | Rajon Rondo | Guard | Louisville, KY (Oak Hill) |
| 2007 | Patrick Patterson | Forward | Huntington, WV (Huntington) |
| 2009 | DeMarcus Cousins | Center | Mobile, AL (LeFlore) |
| 2010 | Terrence Jones | Forward | Portland, OR (Jefferson) |
| 2010 | Brandon Knight | Guard | Ft. Lauderdale, FL (Pine Crest) |
| 2010 | Doron Lamb | Guard | New York, NY (Oak Hill) |
| 2011 | Anthony Davis | Forward | Chicago, IL (Perspectives Charter) |
| 2011 | Michael Gilchrist | Forward | Elizabeth, NJ (St. Patrick) |
| 2011 | Marquis Teague | Guard | Indianapolis, IN (Pike) |
| 2011 | Kyle Wiltjer (Note: Wiltjer transferred to Gonzaga after the 2012–13 season.) | Forward | Portland, OR (Jesuit) |
| 2012 | Archie Goodwin | Guard | Sherwood, AR (Sylvan Hills) |
| 2012 | Alex Poythress | Forward | Clarksville, TN (Northeast) |
| 2013 | Aaron Harrison | Guard | Richmond, TX (Travis) |
| 2013 | Andrew Harrison | Guard | Richmond, TX (Travis) |
| 2013 | Dakari Johnson | Center | New York, NY (Montverde) |
| 2013 | Marcus Lee (Note: Lee transferred to California after the 2015–16 season.) | Forward | Antioch, CA (Deer Valley) |
| 2013 | Julius Randle | Forward | Dallas, TX (Prestonwood) |
| 2013 | James Young | Guard | Rochester, MI (Rochester) |
| 2014 | Devin Booker | Guard | Moss Point, MS (Moss Point) |
| 2014 | Trey Lyles | Forward | Indianapolis, IN (Arsenal Tech) |
| 2014 | Karl Towns Jr. | Forward | Metuchen, NJ (St. Joseph) |
| 2014 | Reid Travis (Note: Travis began his college career at Stanford, playing there through the 2017–18 season. He graduated from Stanford with a year of remaining athletic eligibility and transferred to UK for the 2018–19 season.) | Forward | Minneapolis, MN (De La Salle) |
| 2014 | Tyler Ulis | Guard | Chicago, IL (Roselle Catholic) |
| 2015 | Isaiah Briscoe | Guard | Union, NJ (Roselle Catholic) |
| 2016 | Bam Adebayo | Forward | Little Washington, NC (High Point Christian Academy) |
| 2016 | De'Aaron Fox | Guard | Cypress, TX (Cypress Lakes) |
| 2016 | Sacha Killeya-Jones (Note: Killeya-Jones transferred to NC State after the 2017–18 season.) | Forward | Chapel Hill, NC (Virginia Episcopal) |
| 2016 | Malik Monk | Guard | Lepanto, AR (Bentonville) |
| 2017 | Quade Green (Note: Geeen transferred to Washington after the 2017–18 season.) | Guard | Philadelphia, PA (Neumann–Goretti) |
| 2017 | Kevin Knox II | Forward | Tampa, FL (Tampa Catholic) |
| 2017 | Nick Richards | Center | Kingston, Jamaica (The Patrick School) |
| 2017 | Jarred Vanderbilt | Forward | Missouri City, TX (Victory Prep) |
| 2017 | P. J. Washington | Forward | Frisco, TX (Findlay Prep) |
| 2018 | Keldon Johnson | Forward | South Hill, VA (Oak Hill Academy) |
| 2018 | E. J. Montgomery | Forward | Fort Pierce, FL (Joseph Wheeler) |
| 2018 | Immanuel Quickley | Guard | Havre de Grace, MD (John Carroll School) |
| 2019 | Tyrese Maxey | Guard | Garland, TX (South Garland) |
| 2019 | Oscar Tshiebwe (Note: Tshiebwe began his college career at West Virginia, transferring to Kentucky after the 2020 fall semester. He began play at UK in 2021–22.) | Center | Lubumbashi, DR Congo (Kennedy Catholic) |
| 2019 | Kahlil Whitney | Forward | Chicago, IL (Roselle Catholic) |
| 2020 | Brandon Boston Jr. | Guard | Norcross, GA (Sierra Canyon) |
| 2020 | Terrence Clarke | Guard | Dorchester, MA (Brewster Academy) |
| 2021 | Daimion Collins | Forward | Atlanta, TX (Atlanta) |
| 2022 | Chris Livingston | Forward | Akron, OH (Oak Hill Academy) |
| 2022 | Cason Wallace | Guard | Dallas, TX (Richardson) |
| 2023 | Aaron Bradshaw (Note: Bradshaw transferred to Ohio State after the 2023–24 season.) | Guard | Roselle, NJ (Camden) |
| 2023 | Justin Edwards | Forward | Philadelphia, PA (Imhotep) |
| 2023 | Reed Sheppard | Guard | London, KY (North Laurel) |
| 2023 | D. J. Wagner | Guard | Camden, NJ (Camden) |

== Naismith Hall of Fame Members ==
The following Kentucky players, coaches, and contributors have been enshrined as individuals in the Naismith Memorial Basketball Hall of Fame.

| Year Inducted | Name | Position | Years at Kentucky | Enshrined as |
|---|---|---|---|---|
| 1969 | Adolph Rupp | Head coach | 1930–1972 | Coach |
| 1978 | Cliff Hagan | Player, Administrator | 1950–1954; 1975–1989 | Player |
| 1982 | Frank Ramsey | Player | 1950–1953 | Player |
| 1993 | Dan Issel | Player | 1967–1970 | Player |
| 2000 | C.M. Newton | Player, Administrator | 1949–1951; 1989–2000 | Contributor |
| 2008 | Pat Riley | Player | 1964–1967 | Coach |
| 2013 | Rick Pitino | Head coach | 1989–1997 | Coach |
| 2015 | John Calipari | Head coach | 2009–2024 | Coach |
| 2015 | Louie Dampier | Player | 1964–1967 | Player |
| 2020 | Eddie Sutton | Head coach | 1985–1989 | Coach |
| 2025 | Billy Donovan | Assistant Coach | 1989–1994 | Coach |
UK Hall of Fame Members

In addition to these, Adrian Smith was a member of the 1960 US Olympic team that was inducted as a unit in 2010, and Tayshaun Prince was a member of the 2008 US Olympic team that was inducted as a unit in 2025.

== Olympians ==
The following Kentucky players and coaches have represented their country in basketball in the Summer Olympic Games:

| Year | Player/Coach | Country | Location | Medal |
|---|---|---|---|---|
| 1948 | Cliff Barker | United States | London | Gold |
| 1948 | Ralph Beard | United States | London | Gold |
| 1948 | Alex Groza | United States | London | Gold |
| 1948 | Wah Wah Jones | United States | London | Gold |
| 1948 | Ken Rollins | United States | London | Gold |
| 1948 | Adolph Rupp (asst. coach) | United States | London | Gold |
| 1956 | Billy Evans | United States | Melbourne | Gold |
| 1960 | Adrian Smith | United States | Rome | Gold |
| 2000 | Tubby Smith (asst. coach) | United States | Sydney | Gold |
| 2008 | Tayshaun Prince | United States | Beijing | Gold |
| 2012 | Anthony Davis | United States | London | Gold |
| 2016 | DeMarcus Cousins | United States | Rio de Janeiro | Gold |
| 2020 | Bam Adebayo | United States | Tokyo | Gold |
| 2020 | Devin Booker | United States | Tokyo | Gold |
| 2020 | Keldon Johnson | United States | Tokyo | Gold |
UK Olympians
