= Don Ball (philanthropist) =

American philanthropist and businessman

Donald Ball Sr.

Minority Leader of the Kentucky House of Representatives
- In office January 2, 1968 – January 1, 1970
- Preceded by: James M. Caldwell
- Succeeded by: William Harold DeMarcus

Member of the Kentucky House of Representatives from the 55th district
- In office January 1, 1964 – January 1, 1970
- Preceded by: Franklin Webster (redistricting)
- Succeeded by: David L. Van Horn

Personal details
- Born: July 27, 1936 Henderson County, Kentucky
- Died: March 23, 2018 (aged 81)
- Party: Republican
- Education: University of Kentucky
- Known for: Co-founding Ball Homes

Donald Ball Sr. (July 27, 1936 – March 23, 2018) was an American philanthropist and businessman, who founded the housebuilding company Ball Homes in 1959. He served in the Kentucky House of Representatives from 1964 to 1969, he was also a member of the National Commission on Severely Distressed Public Housing, and became known for his charitable work.

== Early life ==
Ball was born in Hebardsville, an unincorporated place near Henderson, Kentucky, the son of James and Marjorie Ball. In his youth he was involved in the Future Farmers of America. After graduating from Hebbardsville High School in 1954 he moved to Lexington to attend the University of Kentucky, where he met and married Mira Snider. He then became a local real estate investor.

== Career ==
=== Ball Homes ===
Ball and his wife founded Ball Homes in 1959. He was among the first recipients of Builder Magazine's Hearthstone Award for his community service. Ball Homes helped create neighborhoods in Lexington and Versailles such as Masterson Station, Cedar Ridge and Rose Ridge. From 2008 to 2012, the company was voted "Favorite Builder" in the Lexington Herald-Leader's Reader's Choice Awards.

=== Political career ===
From 1964 to 1969, Ball represented the 55th Legislative District in the Kentucky House of Representatives, serving as caucus chairman and the Republican minority leader. He was the youngest member to serve in the General Assembly. From 1989 to 1992, he served on the National Commission on Severely Distressed Public Housing.

=== Hope Center ===
In 1993, Ball established the Hope Center, which helps the homeless. In 2008, the Hope Center opened the George Privett Recovery Center. In 2012, Ford Motor Company and Lincoln donated $10,000 to help the Hope Center's emergency homeless shelter and recovery programs. In 2018, Ball helped fund an expansion of its women's recovery center, which added 30 extra beds to the facility, moving their total up to 105. Prior to expansion, the facility's waiting list ranged anywhere from 40 to 70 people.

== Awards ==
Ball was awarded the Lifetime Public Service Award by investment firm Hearthstone and Builder Magazine in 1999. The couple received the Kentuckian Award from the Happy Chandler Foundation in 2004, the Chutzpah Award from the Paulick Report in 2010, and the William T. Young Lifetime Achievement Award from the Lexington Chamber of Commerce in 2011. In 2012, he was inducted by the Home Builders Association of Lexington into its hall of fame. In 2014, the couple was given “Gift of Blue” for helping Future Farmers of America members that were unable to afford jackets ranging from $50 to $75 buy them. The couple received an honorary doctorate from the University of Kentucky in 2016; Ball also received its Sullivan Award.

== Philanthropy ==
Ball was a supporter of charities including the Alzheimer's Association, the American Cancer Society, Big Brothers Big Sisters of America, Habitat for Humanity, Junior Achievement, the Junior League Horse Show, KET, Relay for Life, The Salvation Army, the United Way, and the University of Kentucky. He helped fund Barkham, which helped build facilities for local charities. Ball was responsible for philanthropic efforts, such as supporting Hoops for Haiti and UK's Dance Blue marathon that raises money for cancer victims, as well as UK HealthCare's Overture to Healing Lexington Philharmonic concert benefit. In 2012, he pledged a $2 million donation to the UK HealthCare Patient Care Facility Fund. On December 11, 2018, his widow, Mira, donated $10 million to the University of Kentucky as a scholarship fund.

== Personal life ==
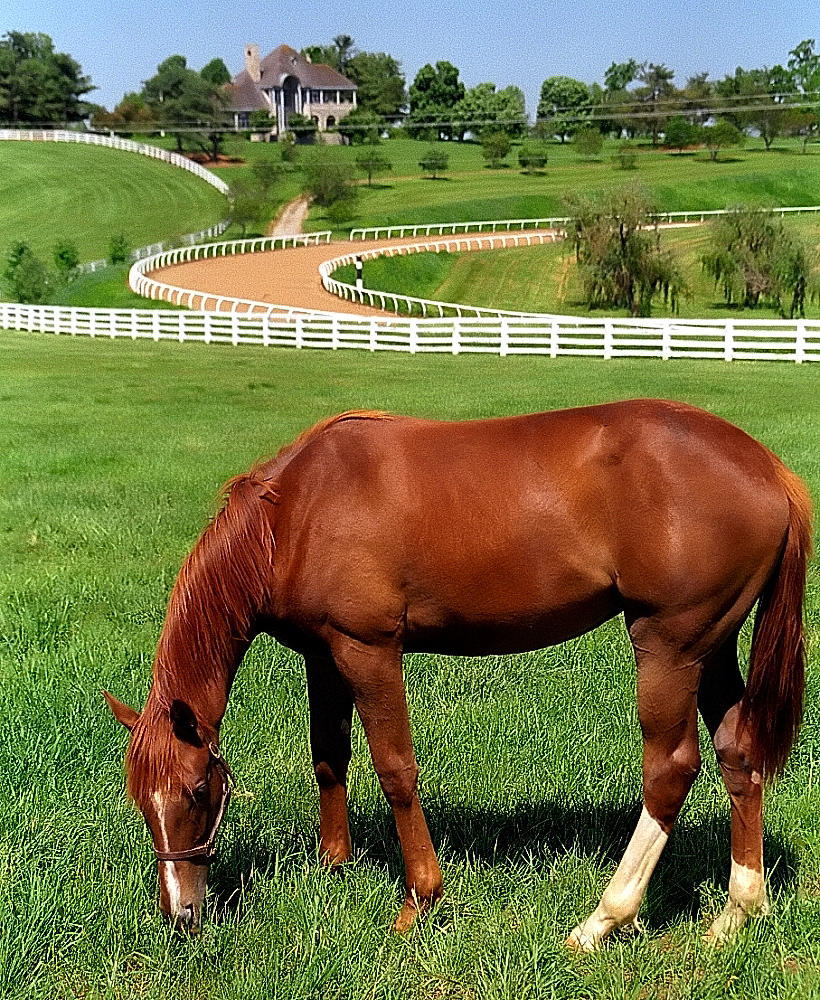
Donamire Farm, where Don Ball lived.

Don and Mira Ball established and lived at the Donamire Farm, a 650-acre thoroughbred farm. The farm was featured in the 1999 film Simpatico.

== Death and legacy ==
Ball died March 23, 2018, at age 81. His death was commented on by Lexington mayor Jim Gray—who referred to Ball as a "modern day Horatio Alger"—and U.S. Senate Majority Leader Mitch McConnell, who described Ball as a "founding father of the modern Republican Party of Kentucky." Public condolences were made by others, including University of Kentucky President Eli Capilouto, Kentucky Senate President Robert Stivers, Governor Matt Bevin, and U.S. Congressman Andy Barr.
