= 1932 College Basketball All-Southern Team =

1932 college basketball season

The 1932 College Basketball All-Southern Team consisted of basketball players from the South chosen at their respective positions.

== All-Southerns ==
=== Guards ===
- Tom Alexander, North Carolina (C-1)
- T. W. Lumpkin, Auburn (C-1)
- Louis Berger, Maryland (C-2)
- Wilmer Hines, North Carolina (C-2)

=== Forwards ===
- Virgil Weathers, North Carolina (C-1)
- Leroy Young, Georgia (C-1)
- Vernon "Catfish" Smith, Georgia (C-2)
- James Thompson, Duke (C-2)

=== Center ===
- Bill Strickland, Georgia (C-1)
- Forest Sale, Kentucky (C-2)

== Key ==
- C = consensus, denoted with 1 for first-team and 2 for second-team
