= Kent Stevens =

American politician

Member of the Kentucky House of Representatives from the 55th district
- In office January 1, 2009 – January 1, 2011
- Preceded by: Milward Dedman
- Succeeded by: Kim King

Personal details
- Born: October 21, 1951 (age 74)
- Party: Democratic

Melvin Kent Stevens (born October 21, 1951) is an American politician from Kentucky who was a member of the Kentucky House of Representatives from 2009 to 2011. Stevens was elected in 2008, defeating Democratic incumbent Milward Dedman for renomination. He was defeated in 2010 by Republican Kim King.
