= Jesse Crenshaw =

American politician (1946–2026)

Member of the Kentucky House of Representatives from the 77th district
- In office January 1, 1993 – January 1, 2015
- Preceded by: Louie Mack
- Succeeded by: George Brown Jr.

Personal details
- Born: September 23, 1946
- Died: April 26, 2026 (aged 79) Lexington, Kentucky, U.S.
- Party: Democratic
- Education: Kentucky State University (BA); University of Kentucky (JD)
- Occupation: Politician; lawyer

Jesse Crenshaw (September 23, 1946 – April 26, 2026) was an American politician and lawyer from Kentucky. He served as a member of the Kentucky House of Representatives for the 77th district from 1993 to 2015. He was first elected to the house in 1992 when incumbent representative Louie Mack did not seek reelection.

== Early life ==
Jesse Crenshaw was born on September 23, 1946, as the first of four sons of Magdalene (née Brewer) and O. C. Crenshaw. His father worked in the automotive industry and was for a time a farmer. His mother was an elementary school teacher. His parents divorced and his mother remarried and took the name Magdalene Bailey. From the age of eight, he was raised by his grandparents Jessie F. and Elva Crenshaw who owned and operated a 168 acres (68 ha) farm in Knob Lick, Metcalfe County, Kentucky. He worked on the farm from a young age. He attended grades one through eight at a segregated elementary one-roomed school called Old Blue Spring. He attended Ralph Bunche High School in Glasgow, Kentucky, a segregated black school, where he graduated as the valedictorian of the class of 1963. His grandfather died in 1963 and he continued to live and work on the farm until September 1964. After graduating with a Bachelor of Arts degree in history and political science from Kentucky State University in 1968, he attended the University of Kentucky College of Law. He then served two years in the United States Army from 1969 to 1971, including service in the Vietnam War. He later graduated with a Juris Doctor from the University of Kentucky College of Law in 1973. He was admitted to the bar in 1974.

== Career ==
Following graduation, Crenshaw worked as a lawyer for the state labor cabinet. He was the first black assistant attorney for the United States District Court for the Eastern District of Kentucky. He also taught criminal law at the Kentucky State University and had a private law practice on Constitution Avenue in Lexington.

Crenshaw supported Democratic Party campaigns and joined a local NAACP chapter in 1979. He was president of the Lexington-Fayette chapter of the NAACP. In 1992, he served as vice chairman of Bill Clinton's presidential campaign in Kentucky. In 1992, he was elected to the Kentucky House of Representatives, becoming the first black member of Fayette County to serve as a state representative. He succeeded Louie Mack as the representative of the 77th district from 1993 to 2015. During his service, he helped build the Eastern State Hospital, establish a new campus for the Bluegrass Community and Technical College, and worked with the University of Kentucky to move the Polk-Dalton clinic to Elm Tree Lane. He advocated for a law to allow most felons to have their voting rights restored, but he was unsuccessful. He worked with the non-profit Community Ventures. He helped get funding for the Robert F. Stephens courthouses in Lexington. Along with Joseph Lambert, he established and funded the Kentucky Legal Education Opportunity program.

Following his retirement as representative, Crenshaw continued his law practice on Constitution Avenue in Lexington.

=== Elections ===
- 1992: Crenshaw was elected in the 1992 Democratic primary and the November 3, 1992 general election.
- 1994: Crenshaw was unopposed for both the 1994 Democratic primary and the November 8, 1994 general election.
- 1996: Crenshaw was unopposed for the November 5, 1996 general election.
- 1998: Crenshaw was unopposed for the 1998 Democratic primary and the November 3, 1998 general election.
- 2000: Crenshaw was unopposed for both the 2000 Democratic primary and the November 7, 2000 general election, winning with 6,363 votes.
- 2002: Crenshaw was unopposed for both the 2002 Democratic primary and the November 5, 2002 general election, winning with 4,589 votes.
- 2004: Crenshaw was unopposed for both the 2004 Democratic primary and the November 2, 2004 general election, winning with 10,252 votes.
- 2006: Crenshaw was unopposed for the 2006 Democratic primary and won the November 7, 2006 general election with 6,231 votes (100%) against Republican nominee Stephen McFayden.
- 2008: Crenshaw was unopposed for both the 2008 Democratic primary and the November 4, 2008 general election, winning with 12,873 votes.
- 2010: Crenshaw was challenged in the May 18, 2010 Democratic primary, winning with 4,532 votes (82.0%) and won the November 2, 2010 general election with 7,131 votes (70.6%) against Republican nominee David Darnell.
- 2012: Crenshaw was unopposed in both the May 22, 2012 Democratic primary and the November 6, 2012 general election, winning with 12,822 votes.

== Personal life ==
Crenshaw was divorced. He lived in Lexington.

Crenshaw died on April 26, 2026, at the University of Kentucky Chandler Hospital in Lexington.

== Awards ==
Crenshaw was elected to the University of Kentucky College of Law Hall of Fame in 2020.
