= Louie Mack =

American politician (1923–2006)

Member of the Kentucky House of Representatives from the 77th district
- In office January 1, 1985 – January 1, 1993
- Preceded by: David L. Van Horn
- Succeeded by: Jesse Crenshaw

Personal details
- Born: November 28, 1923
- Died: February 17, 2006 (aged 82)
- Party: Democratic

Louie Mack (November 28, 1923 – February 17, 2006) was an American politician from Kentucky who was a member of the Kentucky House of Representatives from 1985 to 1993. Mack was first elected to the house in 1984, defeating incumbent representative David L. Van Horn for renomination. He did not seek reelection in 1992.

He died in February 2006 at age 82.
