= Kentucky's 55th House of Representatives district =

American legislative district

Kentucky's 55th State House of Representatives district
Representative
Kim King; R–Harrodsburg
since January 1, 2011
- Registration: 52.2% Republican; 38.4% Democratic; 8.7% No party preference
- Demographics: 88.2% White; 4.2% Black; 2.7% Hispanic; 0.4% Asian; 0.2% Other; 4.3% Multiracial
- Population (2024): 44,940
- Registered voters (2026): 34,685

Kentucky's 55th House of Representatives district is one of 100 districts in the Kentucky House of Representatives. Located in the central part of the state, it comprises Mercer, Washington, and part of Jessamine Counties. It has been represented by Kim King (R–Harrodsburg) since 2011. As of 2024, the district had a population of 44,940.

== Voter registration ==
On January 1, 2026, the district had 34,685 registered voters, who were registered with the following parties.

Party	Registration	
Party	Voters	%
Republican	18,102	52.19
Democratic	13,328	38.43
Independent	1,679	4.84
Libertarian	181	0.52
Green	40	0.12
Constitution	19	0.05
Socialist Workers	7	0.02
Reform	5	0.01
"Other"	1,324	3.82
Total	34,685	100.00

== List of members representing the district ==
Member	Party	Years	Electoral history	District location
Don Ball (Lexington)	Republican	January 1, 1964 – January 1, 1970	Elected in 1963. Reelected in 1965. Reelected in 1967. Retired.	1964–1972; Fayette County (part).
David L. Van Horn (Lexington)	Democratic	January 1, 1970 – January 1, 1972	Elected in 1969. Redistricted to the 77th district.	1964–1972; Fayette County (part).
Forest Sale (Harrodsburg)	Democratic	January 1, 1972 – January 1, 1982	Elected in 1971. Reelected in 1973. Reelected in 1975. Reelected in 1977. Reelected in 1979. Retired.	1972–1974; Marion (part), Mercer, and Washington Counties.
Forest Sale (Harrodsburg)	Democratic	January 1, 1972 – January 1, 1982	Elected in 1971. Reelected in 1973. Reelected in 1975. Reelected in 1977. Reelected in 1979. Retired.	1974–1985; Anderson (part), Garrard, and Mercer Counties.
Tom Jones (Lawrenceburg)	Democratic	January 1, 1982 – January 1, 1991	Elected in 1981. Reelected in 1984. Reelected in 1986. Reelected in 1988. Lost renomination.	1974–1985; Anderson (part), Garrard, and Mercer Counties.
Tom Jones (Lawrenceburg)	Democratic	January 1, 1982 – January 1, 1991	Elected in 1981. Reelected in 1984. Reelected in 1986. Reelected in 1988. Lost renomination.	1985–1993; Anderson, Mercer, and Spencer Counties.
Jack Coleman (Burgin)	Democratic	January 1, 1991 – January 1, 2005	Elected in 1990. Reelected in 1992. Reelected in 1994. Reelected in 1996. Reelected in 1998. Reelected in 2000. Reelected in 2002. Retired.	1985–1993; Anderson, Mercer, and Spencer Counties.
Jack Coleman (Burgin)	Democratic	January 1, 1991 – January 1, 2005	Elected in 1990. Reelected in 1992. Reelected in 1994. Reelected in 1996. Reelected in 1998. Reelected in 2000. Reelected in 2002. Retired.	1993–1997; Anderson, Mercer, and Spencer (part) Counties.
Jack Coleman (Burgin)	Democratic	January 1, 1991 – January 1, 2005	Elected in 1990. Reelected in 1992. Reelected in 1994. Reelected in 1996. Reelected in 1998. Reelected in 2000. Reelected in 2002. Retired.	1997–2003
Jack Coleman (Burgin)	Democratic	January 1, 1991 – January 1, 2005	Elected in 1990. Reelected in 1992. Reelected in 1994. Reelected in 1996. Reelected in 1998. Reelected in 2000. Reelected in 2002. Retired.	2003–2015
Milward Dedman (Harrodsburg)	Republican	January 1, 2005 – September 12, 2007	Elected in 2004. Reelected in 2006. Lost renomination.	2003–2015
Milward Dedman (Harrodsburg)	Democratic	September 12, 2007 – January 1, 2009	Elected in 2004. Reelected in 2006. Lost renomination.	2003–2015
Kent Stevens (Lawrenceburg)	Democratic	January 1, 2009 – January 1, 2011	Elected in 2008. Lost reelection.	2003–2015
Kim King (Harrodsburg)	Republican	January 1, 2011 – present	Elected in 2010. Reelected in 2012. Reelected in 2014. Reelected in 2016. Reelected in 2018. Reelected in 2020. Reelected in 2022. Reelected in 2024. Reelected in 2026.	2003–2015
Kim King (Harrodsburg)	Republican	January 1, 2011 – present	Elected in 2010. Reelected in 2012. Reelected in 2014. Reelected in 2016. Reelected in 2018. Reelected in 2020. Reelected in 2022. Reelected in 2024. Reelected in 2026.	2015–2023
Kim King (Harrodsburg)	Republican	January 1, 2011 – present	Elected in 2010. Reelected in 2012. Reelected in 2014. Reelected in 2016. Reelected in 2018. Reelected in 2020. Reelected in 2022. Reelected in 2024. Reelected in 2026.	2023–present
