= Tom Jones (Kentucky politician) =

American politician (1947–2025)

Member of the Kentucky House of Representatives from the 55th district
- In office January 1, 1982 – January 1, 1991
- Preceded by: Forest Sale
- Succeeded by: Jack Coleman

Personal details
- Born: June 22, 1947 Salvisa, Kentucky, U.S.
- Died: January 14, 2025 (aged 77) Lawrenceburg, Kentucky, U.S.
- Party: Democratic
- Spouse: Ann Frances Sharp
- Children: 2
- Parents: Ezra Theodore Jones (father); Eunice Martin (mother)

Thomas Martin Jones (June 22, 1947 – January 14, 2025) was an American politician from the state of Kentucky. He served as a Democratic member of the Kentucky House of Representatives.

== Life and career ==
Jones was born on June 22, 1947, in Salvisa, Kentucky, the son of Ezra Theodore and Eunice (née Martin) Jones. He married Ann Frances Sharp in 1969, and they had two sons. He served in the U.S. Army from 1969 to 1971, and earned bachelor's and law degrees from the University of Kentucky. He established his law practice in Lawrenceburg, Kentucky, and practiced law for almost five decades.

He was elected to the Kentucky House of Representatives in 1981, and served until he was defeated in the 1990 Democratic primary by Jack Coleman. He attributed his loss to a vote for an education reform and tax package. Educational funding was one of his legislative priorities, and his efforts helped to establish a Lawrenceburg campus for the Bluegrass Community and Technical College.

Jones died at his Lawrenceburg home on January 14, 2025, at the age of 77, having suffered a heart attack.

== Electoral history ==
=== 1981 ===
==== Primary election ====
Kentucky House of Representatives, District 55, 1981 primary election * denotes incumbent Source:
Party	Candidate	Votes	%
Democratic	Tom Jones	3,699	42.7
Democratic	W. B. Wickliffe	3,451	39.9
Democratic	Dennis Lee Warford	1,314	15.2
Democratic	Jimmy Farley	189	2.2
Total votes		8,653	100

==== General election ====
Kentucky House of Representatives, District 55, 1981 general election * denotes incumbent Source:
Party	Candidate	Votes	%
Democratic	Tom Jones	6,229	55.2
Republican	Eddie Long	5,058	44.8
Write-in		1	0.0
Total votes		11,288	100

=== 1984 ===
==== General election ====
Kentucky House of Representatives, District 55, 1984 general election * denotes incumbent Source:
Party	Candidate	Votes	%
Democratic	Tom Jones *	5,639	99.9
Write-in		4	0.1
Total votes		5,643	100

=== 1986 ===
==== Primary election ====
Kentucky House of Representatives, District 55, 1986 primary election * denotes incumbent Source:
Party	Candidate	Votes	%
Democratic	Tom Jones *	2,880	74.3
Democratic	John B. Hamilton	997	25.7
Total votes		3,877	100

==== General election ====
Kentucky House of Representatives, District 55, 1986 general election * denotes incumbent Source:
Party	Candidate	Votes	%
Democratic	Tom Jones *	4,386	100.0
Write-in		2	0.0
Total votes		4,388	100

=== 1988 ===
==== General election ====
Kentucky House of Representatives, District 55, 1988 general election * denotes incumbent Source:
Party	Candidate	Votes	%
Democratic	Tom Jones *	6,204	99.9
Write-in		8	0.1
Total votes		6,212	100

=== 1990 ===
==== Primary election ====
Kentucky House of Representatives, District 55, 1990 primary election * denotes incumbent Source:
Party	Candidate	Votes	%
Democratic	Jack Coleman	3,197	54.4
Democratic	Tom Jones *	2,682	45.6
Total votes		5,879	100
