= Bernard Opper =

American basketball player (1915–2000)

Personal information
- Born: September 1, 1915 Bronx, New York, U.S.
- Died: February 24, 2000 (aged 84) Encino, California, U.S.
- Listed height: 6 ft 0 in (1.83 m)
- Listed weight: 185 lb (84 kg)

Career information
- High school: Morris (Bronx, New York)
- College: Kentucky (1936–1939)
- Playing career: 1939–1947
- Position: Guard

Career history
- 1939–1941: Detroit Eagles
- 1941–1947: Philadelphia Sphas
- 1947: Jersey City Atoms

Career highlights
- 2× ABL champion (1943, 1945); Consensus second-team All-American (1939); 3× All-SEC (1937–1939)

Bernard Opper (September 1, 1915 – February 24, 2000) was an All-American basketball player for the Kentucky Wildcats and then professional player in the National Basketball League and American Basketball League.

== Early life ==
Opper was a native of Bronx, New York, and was Jewish. He attended Morris High School from 1931 to 1935.

== College ==
He went on to play college basketball at the University of Kentucky from 1936 to 1939. A 5 ft 10 in (1.78 m) guard, Opper earned All-Southeastern Conference honors in all three varsity seasons he played. He helped guide Kentucky to the 1937 SEC Tournament championship and then the 1938 regular season title. As a senior in 1938–39, he was named a Consensus Second Team All-American. Opper finished his 59-game Kentucky career with 265 points.

== Professional ==
After college, Opper spent nine years as a professional basketball player, first in the National Basketball League (NBL) and then in the American Basketball League (ABL).

=== National Basketball League ===
In his first professional season, Opper joined the Detroit Eagles of the NBL and averaged almost four points per game. He played in 27 games on a team that finished 17–10 and placed second in the Eastern Division. They would lose to the Akron Goodyears in the playoffs. In his second season with the Eagles, he played in five games before switching teams by joining the Philadelphia Sphas (acronym for South Philadelphia Hebrew Association) who played in the ABL.

=== American Basketball League ===
Opper spent the next seven seasons with the Sphas. During that time, he played on two championship-winning teams in 1943 and 1945. The Philadelphia Sphas were one of the most dominant ABL teams in the 1930s and 1940s, winning seven championships in 15 years. Opper came close to being part of a "four-peat" (winning four titles in successive years) but the Sphas lost to the Wilmington Bombers 4–3 in the finals during the 1943–44 season, and then lost 4–1 to the Baltimore Bullets in 1945–46.

After finishing with a career-high 347 points in 1946–47, which was second on the team in scoring, he moved on to the Jersey City Atoms for the first 10 games of the 1947–48 season. He retired after the Atoms.

== See also ==
- Honored Kentucky Wildcats men's basketball players
- List of select Jewish basketball players
