= Milward Dedman =

American politician

Judge/Executive of Mercer County
- In office July 2009 – November 15, 2021

Member of the Kentucky House of Representatives from the 55th district
- In office January 1, 2005 – January 1, 2009
- Preceded by: Jack Coleman
- Succeeded by: Kent Stevens

Personal details
- Born: November 4, 1964 (age 61)
- Party: Democratic (since 2007); Republican (until 2007)

William Milward Dedman (born November 4, 1964) is an American politician from Kentucky who was a member of the Kentucky House of Representatives from 2005 to 2009. Dedman was first elected in 2004 after Democratic incumbent Jack Coleman retired. He switched parties in 2007, joining the Democratic party. He was then defeated for the Democratic nomination in 2008 by Kent Stevens.
