= Kim King (politician) =

American politician (born 1962)

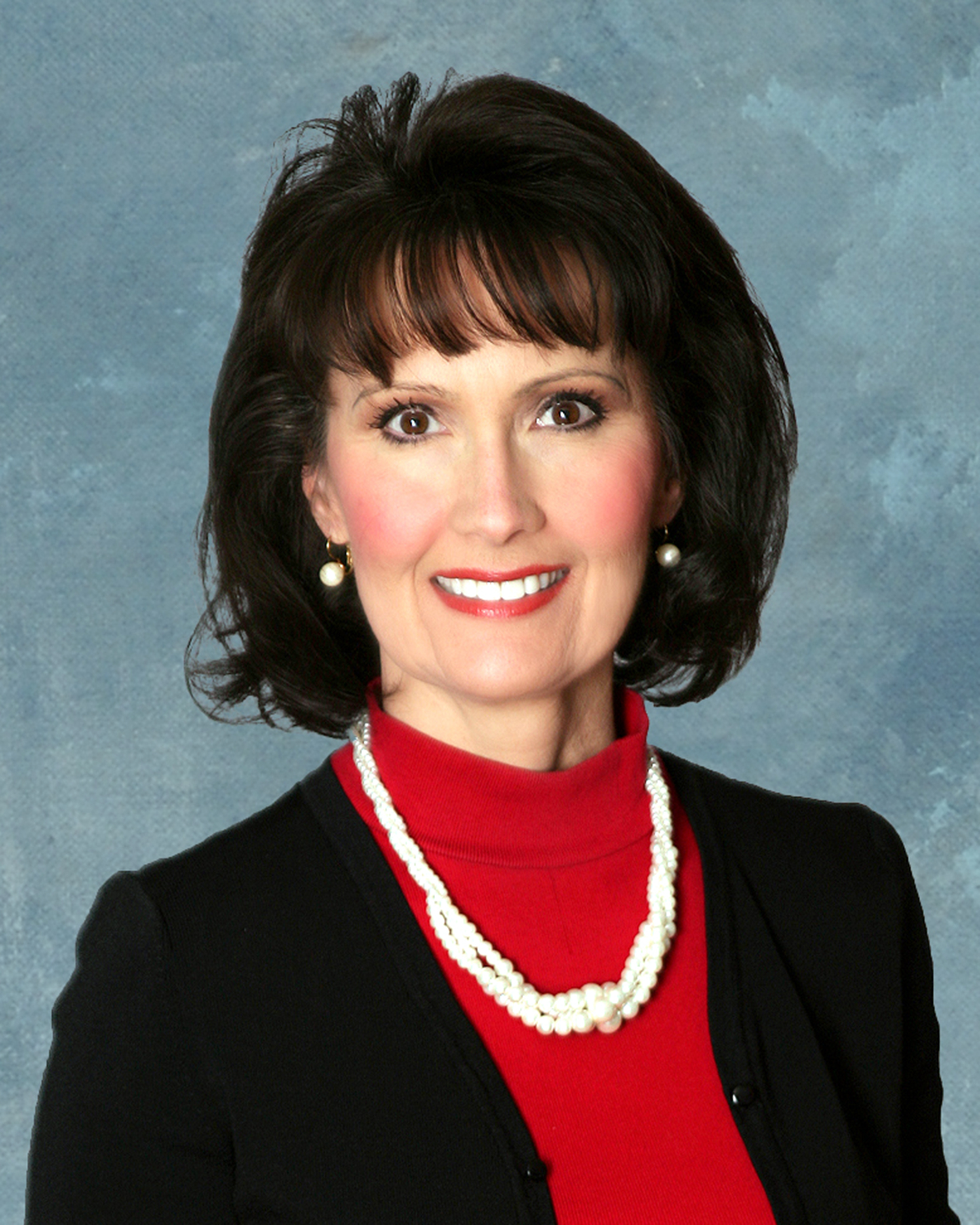

Member of the Kentucky House of Representatives from the 55th district
- Incumbent
- Assumed office January 1, 2011
- Preceded by: Kent Stevens

Personal details
- Born: November 29, 1962 (age 63)
- Party: Republican
- Spouse: Carey King
- Children: 2
- Education: Eastern Kentucky University
- Profession: Farmer, fitness trainer
- Committees: Tourism & Outdoor Recreation (Chair); Agriculture; Economic Development & Workforce Investment; Small Business & Information Technology

Kimberly M. King (born November 29, 1962) is an American politician and Republican member of the Kentucky House of Representatives from Kentucky's 55th House district 55 since January 2011. Her districted is composed of Mercer and Washington counties as well as part of Jessamine County.

== Background ==
King graduated from Mercer County High School in 1980 before earning a Bachelor of Arts in fitness and wellness management from Eastern Kentucky University in 2004, graduating magna cum laude and Phi Kappa Phi. During her time at Eastern she served as president of the Exercise and Sport Science Student Association for three years, and was the first grandmother to graduate from Eastern's Honors Scholars Program.

She is the owner and operator of 4 Kings Angus Cattle Farm.

== Political career ==
=== Leadership ===
Prior to being elected, King served as president of the Mercer County Republican Women's Club as well as publicity chair for the Mercer County Republican Party.

Currently, she serves as chair of the House Standing Committee on Tourism and Outdoor Recreation.

=== Elections ===
- 2010 King was unopposed in the 2010 Republican primary and won the 2010 Kentucky House of Representatives election with 9,167 votes (53.4%) against incumbent Democratic representative Kent Stevens.
- 2012 King was unopposed in the 2012 Republican primary and won the 2012 Kentucky House of Representatives election with 12,931 votes (61.1%) against Democratic candidate Kent Stevens.
- 2014 King was unopposed in the 2014 Republican primary and won the 2014 Kentucky House of Representatives election with 11,110 votes (65%) against Democratic candidate Jacqueline Coleman.
- 2016 King won the 2016 Republican primary with 2,070 votes (84.8%) and won the 2016 Kentucky House of Representatives election with 16,797 votes (75%) against Democratic candidate Tobie Brown.
- 2018 King was unopposed in the 2018 Republican primary and won the 2018 Kentucky House of Representatives election with 12,919 votes (65.7%) against Democratic candidate Cathy Carter.
- 2020 King was unopposed in the 2020 Republican primary and won the 2020 Kentucky House of Representatives election with 20,375 votes (99.8%) against write-in candidate Dylan Franz.
- 2022 King won the 2022 Republican primary with 2,257 votes (54.4%) and was unopposed in the 2022 Kentucky House of Representatives election, winning with 12,485 votes.
- 2024 King was unopposed in the 2024 Republican primary and won the 2024 Kentucky House of Representatives election with 16,382 votes (73.4%) against Democratic candidate Katrina Sexton.
