= 2020–21 Kentucky Wildcats men's basketball team =

2020–21 season of University of Kentucky men's basketball team

2020–21 Kentucky Wildcats men's basketball
- Conference: Southeastern Conference
- Record: 9–16 (8–9 SEC)
- Head coach: John Calipari (12th season)
- Assistant coaches: Jai Lucas (1st season); Joel Justus (5th season); Bruiser Flint (1st season)
- Home arena: Rupp Arena

2020–21 Southeastern Conference men's basketball standings
	Conf.				Overall
Team	W		L	PCT	W		L	PCT
No. 5 Alabama†	16	–	2	.889	26	–	7	.788
No. 10 Arkansas	13	–	4	.765	25	–	7	.781
LSU	11	–	6	.647	19	–	10	.655
Tennessee	10	–	7	.588	18	–	9	.667
Florida	9	–	7	.563	15	–	10	.600
Ole Miss	10	–	8	.556	16	–	12	.571
Missouri	8	–	8	.500	16	–	10	.615
Kentucky	8	–	9	.471	9	–	16	.360
Mississippi State	8	–	10	.444	18	–	15	.545
Georgia	7	–	11	.389	14	–	12	.538
Auburn^{*}	7	–	11	.389	13	–	14	.481
South Carolina	4	–	12	.250	6	–	15	.286
Texas A&M	2	–	8	.200	8	–	10	.444
Vanderbilt	3	–	13	.188	9	–	16	.360
† 2021 SEC tournament winner^{*} Ineligible for postseason due to self-imposed postseason ban.

The 2020–21 Kentucky Wildcats men's basketball team represented the University of Kentucky in the 2020–21 NCAA Division I men's basketball season. The team played its home games in Lexington, Kentucky, for the 45th consecutive season at Rupp Arena, with a capacity of 20,545. The Wildcats were led by John Calipari in his 12th season as head coach and play in the Southeastern Conference.

The Wildcats season was marred by inconsistent stretches. The Wildcats got off to an ugly 1–6 start (the worst since 1911) and never recovered. They finished the season with a 9–16 overall record and 8–9 in conference for 8th place. It was Kentucky's first losing season since 1988–89 and its worst winning percentage since the 1926–27 season. Their season came to an end when they lost to Mississippi State 74–73, ending their year also not participating in the NCAA tournament for the first time since the 2012–13 season.

The season also marked the worst season that John Calipari had coached since 1988–89, when he was in his first season as head coach of Massachusetts.

== Previous season ==
The Wildcats finished the season 25–6, 15–3 in SEC play to win the SEC regular season championship. They were set to be the No. 1 seed in the SEC tournament with a bye to the quarterfinals. However, the SEC Tournament was canceled amid the COVID-19 pandemic. Kentucky was announced as the league's champion following the cancellation of the tournament and, therefore, received the conference's automatic bid to the NCAA tournament. However, shortly thereafter, the NCAA Tournament was also canceled due to the coronavirus pandemic.

== Offseason ==
=== Coaching changes ===
==== Departures ====
Name	Position	Year at Kentucky	Alma mater (year)	Reason for departure
Kenny Payne	Associate head coach	11th	Louisville (1989)	Hired as assistant by the New York Knicks

==== Additions to staff ====
Name	Position	Year at Kentucky	Alma mater (year)	Previous Team
Bruiser Flint	Assistant coach	1st	Saint Joseph's (1987)	Indiana
Jai Lucas	Assistant coach/Recruiting Coordinator	1st	Texas (2011)	Texas

=== Player departures ===
Name	Number	Pos.	Height	Weight	Year	Hometown	Reason left
Ashton Hagans	0	Guard	6'3"	198	Sophomore	Covington, Georgia	Declared for the 2020 NBA draft
Tyrese Maxey	3	Guard	6'3"	198	Freshman	Garland, Texas	Declared for the 2020 NBA draft; selected 21st overall by the Philadelphia 76ers
Immanuel Quickley	5	Guard	6'3"	188	Sophomore	Havre de Grace, Maryland	Declared for the 2020 NBA draft; selected 25th overall by the Oklahoma City Thunder
Kahlil Whitney	2	Guard	6'6"	190	Freshman	Roselle, New Jersey	Left team at midseason and later declared for the 2020 NBA draft
Johnny Juzang	10	Guard	6'7"	214	Freshman	Los Angeles, California	Transferred to UCLA
Nate Sestina	1	Forward	6'9"	234	Graduate Student	Emporium, Pennsylvania	Completed athletic eligibility; graduated from Bucknell in 2019
E. J. Montgomery	23	Forward	6'10"	228	Sophomore	Marietta, Georgia	Declared for the 2020 NBA draft
Nick Richards	4	Forward	6'11"	247	Junior	Kingston, Jamaica	Declared for the 2020 NBA draft; selected 42nd overall by the New Orleans Pelicans

=== 2020 recruiting class ===
On July 27, 2019, Brandon Boston Jr. committed to play basketball for the University of Kentucky over offers from Florida and Duke. Boston was the first commitment to the 2020 recruiting class, and the #2 ranked shooting guard in the 2020 class by 247 sports.

Cam'Ron Fletcher, from St. Louis, Missouri, was the second commitment in the Kentucky 2020 recruiting class. He committed to Kentucky on August 4, 2019, and chose Kentucky over Michigan State. He is a consensus four-star player by the four main recruiting services and is ranked #36 overall by 24/7 Sports.

Power forward Lance Ware, from Camden, New Jersey, was the third commitment in the Kentucky 2020 recruiting class. He committed to Kentucky on September 12, 2019, and chose Kentucky over Ohio State. He is a consensus four-star player by the four main recruiting services and is ranked #32 overall by Rivals.

Two days later, on September 14, 2019, SF Terrence Clarke from Brewster Academy pledged to Kentucky. Clarke is one of the most highly regarded prospects in the 2020 class, with most services ranking him among the top five players overall.

College recruiting information
Name	Hometown	School	Height	Weight	Commit date
Brandon Boston Jr. SG	Norcross, GA	Sierra Canyon (CA)	6 ft 6 in (1.98 m)	175 lb (79 kg)	Jul 27, 2019
Brandon Boston Jr. SG	Recruit ratings: Scout: Rivals: 247Sports: ESPN: (96)				
Cam'Ron Fletcher; SF	St. Louis, MO	Vashon (MO)	6 ft 6 in (1.98 m)	180 lb (82 kg)	Aug 4, 2019
Cam'Ron Fletcher; SF	Recruit ratings: Scout: Rivals: 247Sports: ESPN: (83)				
Lance Ware; PF	Camden, NJ	Camden (NJ)	6 ft 9 in (2.06 m)	205 lb (93 kg)	Sep 12, 2019
Lance Ware; PF	Recruit ratings: Scout: Rivals: 247Sports: ESPN: (87)				
Terrence Clarke; SG	Boston, MA	Brewster Academy (NH)	6 ft 7 in (2.01 m)	190 lb (86 kg)	Sep 14, 2019
Terrence Clarke; SG	Recruit ratings: Scout: Rivals: 247Sports: ESPN: (95)				
Devin Askew; PG	Sacramento, CA	Mater Dei (CA)	6 ft 3 in (1.91 m)	195 lb (88 kg)	Oct 17, 2019
Devin Askew; PG	Recruit ratings: Scout: Rivals: 247Sports: ESPN: (91)				
Isaiah Jackson; PF	Pontiac, MI	Waterford Mott (MI)	6 ft 8 in (2.03 m)	200 lb (91 kg)	Nov 16, 2019
Isaiah Jackson; PF	Recruit ratings: Scout: Rivals: 247Sports: ESPN: (89)				
Overall recruit ranking: Rivals: 1st 247Sports: 1st ESPN: 1st
Note: In many cases, Scout, Rivals, 247Sports, On3, and ESPN may conflict in their listings of height and weight.; In these cases, the average was taken. ESPN grades are on a 100-point scale.; Sources: "Kentucky 2020 Basketball Commitments". Rivals.; "2020 Team Ranking". Rivals.

=== Incoming transfers ===
==== Preseason ====
Name	Number	Pos.	Height	Weight	Year	Hometown	Previous School
Jacob Toppin	0	F	6'9"	194	Sophomore	Brooklyn, NY	Rhode Island
Davion Mintz	10	G	6'3"	196	Graduate Student	Charlotte, NC	Creighton
Olivier Sarr	30	C	7'0"	237	Senior	Toulouse, France	Wake Forest

==== In-season ====
Name	Number	Pos.	Height	Weight	Year	Hometown	Previous School	Years Eligible	Date Eligible
Oscar Tshiebwe	34	C	6'9"	260	Sophomore	Lubumbashi, DR Congo	West Virginia	3 (Note: Due to a special NCAA ruling, the 2020–21 season does not count against the eligibility of players in all NCAA winter sports, including basketball.)	October 1, 2021

== Roster ==
2020–21 Kentucky Wildcats men's basketball team
Players
Coaches

Pos.	#	Name	Height	Weight	Year	Previous school	Hometown
F	0	Jacob Toppin	6 ft 9 in (2.06 m)	194 lb (88 kg)	So	Rhode Island	Brooklyn, NY
G	2	Devin Askew	6 ft 3 in (1.91 m)	198 lb (90 kg)	Fr	Mater Dei	Sacramento, CA
G	3	Brandon Boston Jr.	6 ft 7 in (2.01 m)	185 lb (84 kg)	Fr	Sierra Canyon	Norcross, GA
G	5	Terrence Clarke	6 ft 7 in (2.01 m)	194 lb (88 kg)	Fr	Brewster Academy	Boston, MA
G	10	Davion Mintz	6 ft 3 in (1.91 m)	196 lb (89 kg)	GS	Creighton	Charlotte, NC
G	11	Dontaie Allen	6 ft 6 in (1.98 m)	198 lb (90 kg)	RS Fr	Pendleton County	Falmouth, KY
F	12	Keion Brooks Jr.	6 ft 7 in (2.01 m)	205 lb (93 kg)	So	La Lumiere School	Fort Wayne, IN
G	13	Riley Welch (W)	6 ft 0 in (1.83 m)	185 lb (84 kg)	Sr	UC Irvine	Littleton, CO
F	14	Brennan Canada (W)	6 ft 6 in (1.98 m)	198 lb (90 kg)	So	George Rogers Clark	Mount Sterling, KY
G/F	20	Zan Payne (W)	6 ft 4 in (1.93 m)	215 lb (98 kg)	RS So	Lexington Catholic	Lexington, KY
F	21	Cam'Ron Fletcher	6 ft 6 in (1.98 m)	215 lb (98 kg)	Fr	Vashon	St. Louis, MO
F	23	Isaiah Jackson	6 ft 10 in (2.08 m)	206 lb (93 kg)	Fr	Waterford Mott	Pontiac, MI
G	25	Kareem Watkins (W)	5 ft 8 in (1.73 m)	145 lb (66 kg)	Fr	Kingsway Regional	Camden, NJ
C	30	Olivier Sarr	7 ft 0 in (2.13 m)	237 lb (108 kg)	Sr	Wake Forest	Toulouse, FRA
F	55	Lance Ware	6 ft 9 in (2.06 m)	223 lb (101 kg)	Fr	Camden	Camden, NJ

Head coach

- John Calipari (Clarion)

Assistant coach(es)

- Tony Barbee (UMass)
- Joel Justus (UNC Wilmington)
- John Robic (Denison)

Legend

- (C) Team captain
- (S) Suspended
- (I) Ineligible
- (W) Walk-on
- Injured
- Current redshirt

Roster
Last update: October 21, 2020

== Schedule and results ==
Date time, TV	Rank^{#}	Opponent^{#}	Result	Record	High points	High rebounds	High assists	Site (attendance) city, state
Non-conference regular season
November 25, 2020*; 6:00 p.m., SECN	No. 10	Morehead State	W 81–45	1–0	15 – Boston Jr.	7 – Boston Jr.	4 – Tied	Rupp Arena (3,075); Lexington, KY
November 29, 2020*; 1:00 p.m., ESPN	No. 10	Richmond	L 64–76	1–1	20 – Boston Jr.	11 – Sarr	2 – Tied	Rupp Arena (3,075); Lexington, KY
December 1, 2020*; 9:30 p.m., ESPN	No. 20	vs. No. 7 Kansas; Champions Classic	L 62–65	1–2	12 – Boston Jr.	12 – Jackson	2 – Tied	Bankers Life Fieldhouse (0); Indianapolis, IN
December 6, 2020*; 5:00 p.m., ESPN	No. 20	vs. Georgia Tech	L 62–79	1–3	22 – Clarke	12 – Jackson	6 – Mintz	State Farm Arena (0); Atlanta, GA
December 12, 2020*; 12:00 p.m., CBS		Notre Dame	L 63–64	1–4	22 – Sarr	7 – Sarr	4 – Mintz	Rupp Arena (3,075); Lexington, KY
December 19, 2020*; 2:00 p.m., CBS		vs. No. 22 North Carolina; CBS Sports Classic	L 63–75	1–5	17 – Mintz	8 – Mintz	3 – Askew	Rocket Mortgage FieldHouse (0); Cleveland, OH
December 26, 2020*; 1:00 p.m., ESPN		at Louisville; Battle for the Bluegrass	L 59–62	1–6	19 – Mintz	7 – Tied	3 – Askew	KFC Yum! Center (3,281); Louisville, KY
SEC regular season
December 29, 2020; 7:00 p.m., ESPN2		South Carolina	Postponed due to COVID-19 issues					Rupp Arena; Lexington, KY
January 2, 2021; 6:00 p.m., SECN		at Mississippi State	W 78–73 ^{2OT}	2–6 (1–0)	23 – Allen	12 – Ware	6 – Askew	Humphrey Coliseum (1,000); Starkville, MS
January 5, 2021; 7:00 p.m., SECN		Vanderbilt	W 77–74	3–6 (2–0)	24 – Sarr	7 – Sarr	3 – Askew	Rupp Arena (3,075); Lexington, KY
January 9, 2021; 5:00 p.m., ESPN		at Florida	W 76–58	4–6 (3–0)	13 – Tied	6 – Tied	4 – Brooks	O'Connell Center (2,324); Gainesville, FL
January 12, 2021; 9:00 p.m., ESPN		Alabama	L 65–85	4–7 (3–1)	14 – Jackson	6 – Tied	2 – Tied	Rupp Arena (3,075); Lexington, KY
January 16, 2021; 2:00 p.m., ESPN		at Auburn	L 59–66	4–8 (3–2)	11 – Mintz	6 – Tied	3 – Askew	Auburn Arena (1,824); Auburn, AL
January 20, 2021; 7:00 p.m., SECN		at Georgia	L 62–63	4–9 (3–3)	18 – Boston Jr.	13 – Sarr	4 – Askew	Stegeman Coliseum (1,638); Athens, GA
January 23, 2021; 6:00 p.m., ESPN		LSU	W 82–69	5–9 (4–3)	18 – Boston Jr.	15 – Jackson	4 – Askew	Rupp Arena (3,075); Lexington, KY
January 26, 2021; 7:00 p.m., ESPN		at No. 9 Alabama	L 59–70	5–10 (4–4)	12 – Tied	5 – Tied	4 – Mintz	Coleman Coliseum (2,055); Tuscaloosa, AL
January 30, 2021*; 8:00 p.m., ESPN		No. 5 Texas; Big 12/SEC Challenge	Canceled due to COVID-19 issues					Rupp Arena; Lexington, KY
February 3, 2021; 7:00 p.m., ESPN2		at No. 18 Missouri; Rescheduled from Feb. 2 due to COVID-19 issues	L 70–75	5–11 (4–5)	18 – Mintz	10 – Tied	4 – Askew	Mizzou Arena (3,033); Columbia, MO
February 6, 2021; 8:00 p.m., ESPN		No. 11 Tennessee	L 71–82	5–12 (4–6)	23 – Brooks Jr.	11 – Brooks Jr.	4 – Askew	Rupp Arena (3,075); Lexington, KY
February 9, 2021; 7:00 p.m., ESPN		Arkansas	L 80–81	5–13 (4–7)	17 – Boston Jr.	10 – Sarr	6 – Askew	Rupp Arena (3,075); Lexington, KY
February 13, 2021; 1:00 p.m., CBS		Auburn	W 82–80	6–13 (5–7)	18 – Jackson	11 – Jackson	4 – Tied	Rupp Arena (3,075); Lexington, KY
February 17, 2021; 7:00 p.m., SECN		at Vanderbilt	W 82–78	7–13 (6–7)	18 – Mintz	9 – Tied	5 – Brooks Jr.	Memorial Gymnasium (164); Nashville, TN
February 20, 2021; 1:00 p.m., CBS		at No. 19 Tennessee	W 70–55	8–13 (7–7)	16 – Jackson	14 – Brooks Jr.	4 – Askew	Thompson-Boling Arena (4,191); Knoxville, TN
February 23, 2021; 7:00 p.m., ESPN/ESPN2		Texas A&M	Canceled due to COVID-19 issues					Rupp Arena; Lexington, KY
February 27, 2021; 4:00 p.m., CBS		Florida	L 67–71	8–14 (7–8)	21 – Mintz	5 – Jackson	3 – Askew	Rupp Arena (3,075); Lexington, KY
March 2, 2021; 9:00 p.m., ESPN		at Ole Miss	L 62–70	8–15 (7–9)	16 – Brooks Jr.	8 – Brooks Jr.	8 – Mintz	The Pavilion at Ole Miss (895); Oxford, MS
March 6, 2021; 12:00 p.m., ESPN		South Carolina; Makeup from Dec. 29 postponement	W 92–64	9–15 (8–9)	21 – Boston Jr.	10 – Jackson	7 – Mintz	Rupp Arena (3,075); Lexington, KY
SEC Tournament
March 11, 2021; 12:00 p.m., SECN	(8)	vs. (9) Mississippi State; Second round	L 73–74	9–16	23 – Allen	5 – Tied	8 – Mintz	Bridgestone Arena (1,733); Nashville, TN
*Non-conference game. ^{#}Rankings from AP Poll. (#) Tournament seedings in parentheses. All times are in Eastern Time.

== Rankings ==
On January 18, 2021, Duke fell out of the AP Top 25 ranking for the first time since February 8, 2016. This broke a 59-year streak and marked the first time since December 25, 1961 that the powerhouse trio of Duke, Kentucky and North Carolina were all out of the Top 25 ranking.

Ranking movements Legend: ██ Increase in ranking ██ Decrease in ranking — = Not ranked RV = Received votes
	Week																	
Poll	Pre	1	2	3	4	5	6	7	8	9	10	11	12	13	14	15	16	Final
AP	10	20	—	—	—	—	—	—	—	—	—	—	—	—	—	—	—	Not released
Coaches	9	9^	RV	—	—	—	—	—	—	—	—	—	—	—	—	—	—	—

^Coaches did not release a Week 1 poll.
