= Jack Coleman (politician) =

American politician

Member of the Kentucky House of Representatives from the 55th district
- In office January 1, 1991 – January 1, 2005
- Preceded by: Tom Jones
- Succeeded by: Milward Dedman

Personal details
- Born: Jack Lillard Coleman Jr. October 1, 1953 (age 72) Lexington, Kentucky, U.S.
- Party: Democratic
- Children: Jacqueline Coleman
- Parent: Jack Coleman
- Education: Eastern Kentucky University

Jack Lillard Coleman Jr. (born October 1, 1953) is an American politician in the state of Kentucky. He served in the Kentucky House of Representatives from 1991 to 2005. Coleman was first elected to the house in 1990, defeating Democratic incumbent Tom Jones for renomination. He did not seek reelection in 2004 and was succeeded by Republican Milward Dedman. Coleman also was a city commissioner of Harrodsburg, Kentucky from 2016 to 2018. Coleman also served on the Burgin Independent School Board and served as vice-chair of the school board.

Coleman's father, Jack Sr., played in the National Basketball Association. His daughter, Jacqueline, was elected Lieutenant Governor of Kentucky in 2019.
