= David L. Van Horn =

American politician (1929–2001)

Member of the Kentucky House of Representatives
- In office January 1, 1978 – January 1, 1985
- Preceded by: Glenna A. Bevins
- Succeeded by: Louie Mack
- Constituency: 77th district
- In office January 1, 1970 – January 1, 1976
- Preceded by: Don Ball
- Succeeded by: Glenna A. Bevins
- Constituency: 55th district (1970–1972); 77th district (1972–1976)

Personal details
- Born: December 3, 1929
- Died: December 31, 2001 (aged 72)
- Party: Democratic

David Lee Van Horn (December 3, 1929 – December 31, 2001) was an American politician from Kentucky who was a member of the Kentucky House of Representatives from 1970 to 1976 and 1978 to 1985. Van Horn was first elected in 1969 following the retirement of incumbent representative Don Ball. He did not run for reelection in 1975, instead unsuccessfully running for Attorney General in which he lost the Democratic nomination to Robert F. Stephens.

Van Horn returned to the house in 1977, defeating Ernesto Scorsone and incumbent representative Glenna A. Bevins for the Democratic nomination. In 1984, he was defeated for renomination by Louie Mack.

Van Horn died on December 31, 2001.

Kentucky House of Representatives
Preceded by Don Ball	Member of the Kentucky House of Representatives from the 55th district 1970–1972	Succeeded by Forest Sale
Preceded by Darvin Allen	Member of the Kentucky House of Representatives from the 77th district 1972–1976	Succeeded by Glenna A. Bevins
Preceded by Glenna A. Bevins	Member of the Kentucky House of Representatives from the 77th district 1978–1985	Succeeded by Louie Mack
