= Terrence Clarke =

American basketball player (2001–2021)

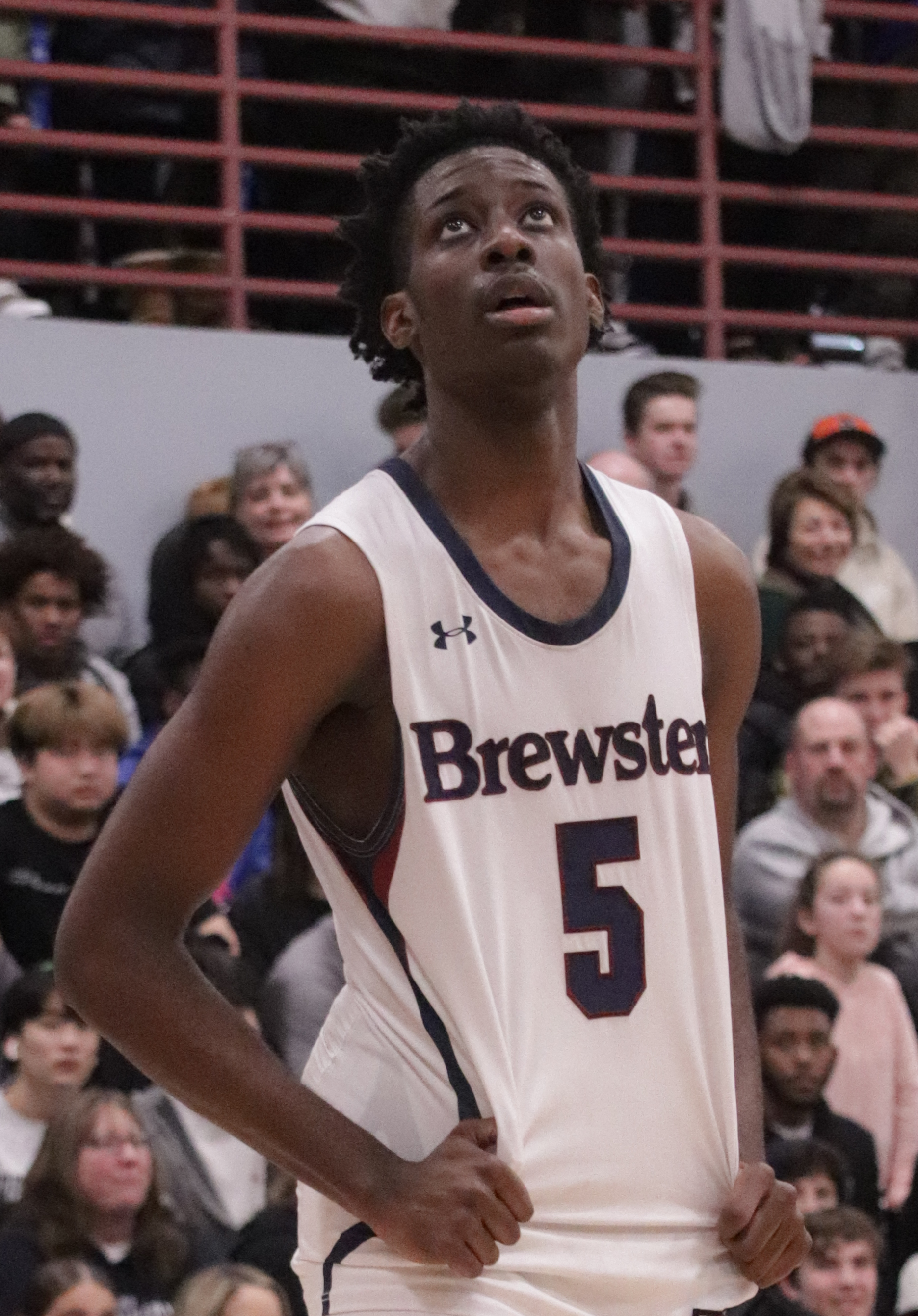
- Clarke with Brewster Academy in 2020

Personal information
- Born: September 6, 2001 Boston, Massachusetts, U.S.
- Died: April 22, 2021 (aged 19) Los Angeles, California, U.S.
- Listed height: 6 ft 7 in (2.01 m)
- Listed weight: 194 lb (88 kg)

Career information
- High school: Rivers School (Weston, Massachusetts); Brewster Academy (Wolfeboro, New Hampshire); Rectory School (Pomfret, Connecticut)
- College: Kentucky (2020–2021)
- Position: Shooting guard
- Number: 5

Career highlights
- McDonald's All-American (2020)

Terrence Adrian Clarke (September 6, 2001 – April 22, 2021) was an American college basketball player for the Kentucky Wildcats of the Southeastern Conference (SEC). Clarke was a standout Amateur Athletic Union (AAU) basketball player for Todd Quarles at Expressions Elite in Braintree, Massachusetts. He began his high school career at Rivers School before transferring to Brewster Academy, where his team won the 2019 National Prep Championships. Named a McDonald's All-American, Clarke was a consensus five-star recruit and one of the best shooting guards in the 2020 class. He played one season in college for Kentucky before declaring for the 2021 NBA draft.

Clarke died in a car crash in Los Angeles, California, on April 22, 2021, three months before the draft. In the 2021 NBA draft, he was drafted posthumously in the first round by the league during a ceremony that was held between the 14th and 15th pick selections.

== Early life ==
Terrence Clarke was born on September 6, 2001, at Beth Israel Deaconess Medical Center in Boston, Massachusetts, to Osmine Clarke and Adrian Briggs. He originally attended Rivers School in Weston, Massachusetts, before he transferred to Brewster Academy after his freshman season. At Rivers, he was named to the all-New England Preparatory School Athletic Council class B team. At Brewster, he won the 2019 National Prep Championships. As a senior, Clarke averaged 18.3 points per game with 5.8 rebounds per game and 3 assists per game as Brewster finished with a 34–3 record before the COVID-19 pandemic ended the National Prep finals. Clarke was selected for the McDonald's All-American Game, an all-star boys' basketball game which comprises many of the top-ranked American and Canadian high school basketball graduates played the same day as a counterpart girls' game, and was selected as a Sports Illustrated third-team All American, a team composed of the third-best boys' high school senior players in the United States.

Rivals, ESPN, and 247Sports all evaluated Clarke as a five-star recruit, with Rivals and 247Sports ranking him as the eighth-best player, and ESPN as the tenth-best player in the 2020 class. On September 14, 2019, Clarke announced his commitment to Kentucky over offers from Boston College, Duke, Memphis, Texas Tech, and UCLA. He also announced that he was reclassifying to the class of 2020. Clarke was ranked as the number-two player in the 2021 class before reclassifying according to ESPN.

== College career ==
In his college debut on November 25, 2020, Clarke posted 12 points, four rebounds, four assists, and three steals in an 81–45 win over Morehead State. Due to a right leg injury, he was limited to eight games during the season, seven in non-conference play and one in the SEC tournament, making six starts and averaging 9.6 points, 2.6 rebounds and two assists per game. Clarke scored a career-high 22 points against the Georgia Tech Yellow Jackets on December 6, 2020. He finished his collegiate career with 77 points over 229 minutes played. On March 19, 2021, Clarke announced that he would forgo his remaining college eligibility and declare for the 2021 NBA draft. One day prior to his death, Clarke signed with Klutch Sports Group.

== Death and tributes ==
Following a workout with teammate Brandon Boston Jr., Clarke died at the age of 19 on April 22, 2021, in Los Angeles, California, after being involved in a traffic collision. The Los Angeles Police Department stated that Clarke was driving at an extremely high speed when he ran a red light, hitting a car that was turning left and then hit a pole and block wall. He was driving a 2021 Genesis GV80 without wearing his seat belt properly. Clarke's agent Rich Paul said he was motivated, was in the best shape of his life, had grown to 6'8" and was putting in work to be a lottery pick in the 2021 NBA draft.

On July 29, 2021, between the 14th and 15th picks of the 2021 NBA draft, NBA Commissioner Adam Silver made Clarke a ceremonial pick, fulfilling his dream of being drafted to the NBA. Clarke's mother Osmine, brother Gavin, and sister Tatyana accepted on his behalf. For the Rising Stars Challenge during the 2022 NBA All-Star Weekend, his mother received an honorary jersey of Clarke's for the game.

On February 17, 2024, during the 2024 NBA All Star Weekend, Celtics player Jaylen Brown paid tribute to Clarke by wearing his high school jersey during the Final Round of the NBA Slam Dunk Contest. Brown also wore a "Clarke" Celtics jersey during the Celtics 2024 championship victory parade.

On June 23, 2026, during the 2026 NBA draft, number one pick AJ Dybantsa, wore a "TC5" pin in his honor as someone whom he admired and practiced with.

== Career statistics ==
Legend
| GP | Games played | GS | Games started | MPG | Minutes per game |
| FG% | Field goal percentage | 3P% | 3-point field goal percentage | FT% | Free throw percentage |
| RPG | Rebounds per game | APG | Assists per game | SPG | Steals per game |
| BPG | Blocks per game | PPG | Points per game | **Bold** | Career high |

=== College ===
| Year | Team | GP | GS | MPG | FG% | 3P% | FT% | RPG | APG | SPG | BPG | PPG |
|---|---|---|---|---|---|---|---|---|---|---|---|---|
| 2020–21 | Kentucky | 8 | 6 | 28.6 | .421 | .217 | .471 | 2.6 | 2.0 | .6 | .1 | 9.6 |

== See also ==
- List of basketball players who died during their careers
