= Brandon Boston Jr. =

American basketball player (born 2001)

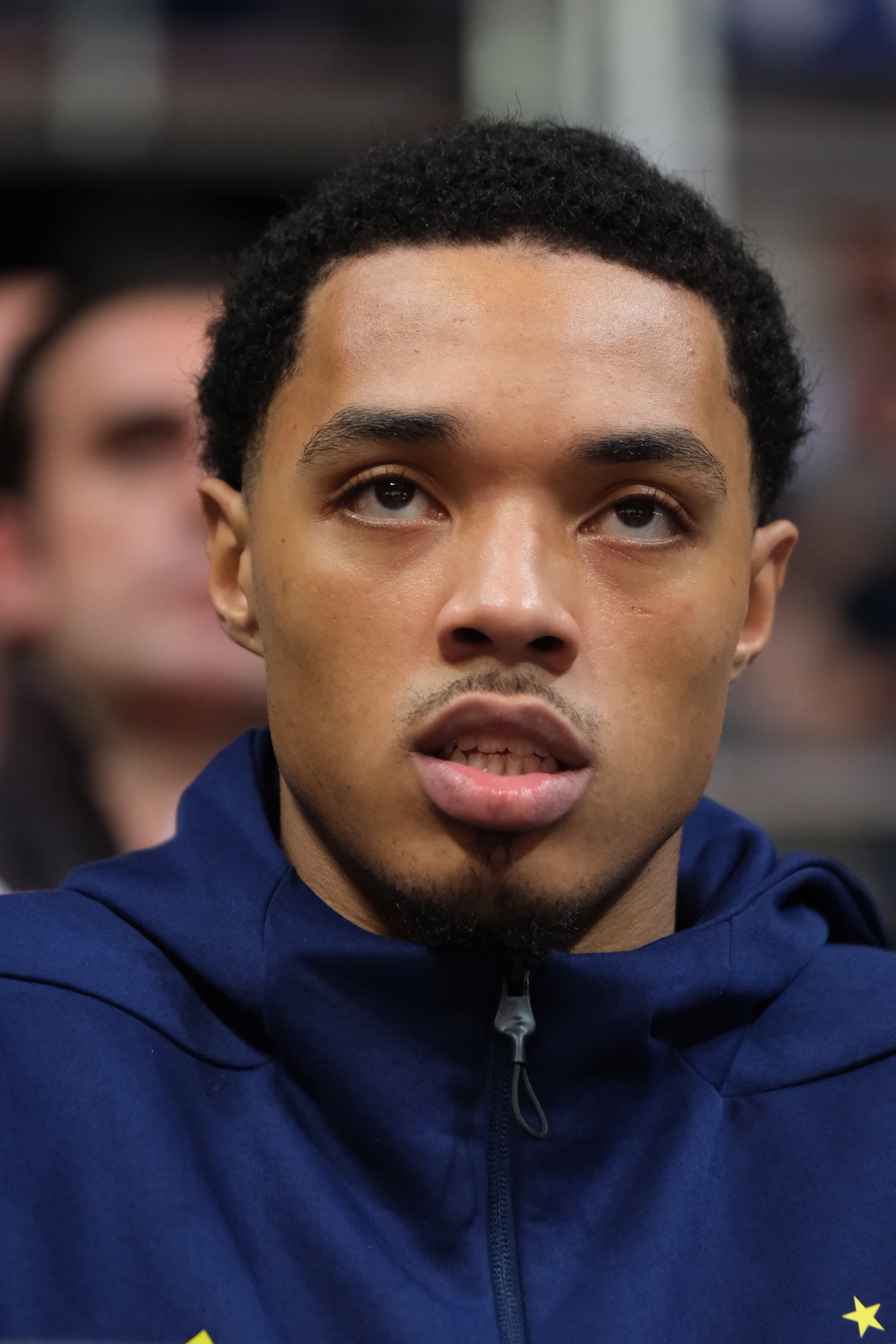
- Boston in 2025

No. 5 – Trabzonspor
- Position: Shooting guard / small forward
- League: BSL

Personal information
- Born: November 28, 2001 (age 24) Norcross, Georgia, U.S.
- Listed height: 6 ft 6 in (1.98 m)
- Listed weight: 188 lb (85 kg)

Career information
- High school: Norcross (Norcross, Georgia); Sierra Canyon (Chatsworth, California)
- College: Kentucky (2020–2021)
- NBA draft: 2021: 2nd round, 51st overall pick
- Drafted by: Memphis Grizzlies
- Playing career: 2021–present

Career history
- 2021–2024: Los Angeles Clippers
- 2021–2024: →Agua Caliente / Ontario Clippers
- 2024–2025: New Orleans Pelicans
- 2025–2026: Fenerbahçe
- 2026–present: Trabzonspor

Career highlights
- Turkish Super League champion (2026); Turkish Cup winner (2026); McDonald's All-American (2020); California Mr. Basketball (2020)
- Stats at NBA.com
- Stats at Basketball Reference

Brandon Elliot Boston Jr. (born November 28, 2001) is an American professional basketball player for Trabzonspor of the Turkish Basketbol Süper Ligi (BSL). He played college basketball for the Kentucky Wildcats.

== High school career ==
Boston originally attended Norcross High School in Norcross, Georgia before transferring to Sierra Canyon School in the Los Angeles neighborhood of Chatsworth in 2019. He played alongside LeBron James's son Bronny James and Dwyane Wade's son Zaire Wade. In his final season at Norcross, he averaged 18.4 points and 5.4 rebounds per game.

He was selected to play in the 2020 McDonald's All-American Boys Game. He was also selected to play in the 2020 Jordan Brand Classic.

=== Recruiting ===
A five-star recruit, Boston committed to play college basketball at the University of Kentucky.

College recruiting
Name	Hometown	School	Height	Weight	Commit date
Brandon Boston Jr. SG	Norcross, GA	Sierra Canyon School (CA)	6 ft 7 in (2.01 m)	175 lb (79 kg)	Jul 27, 2019
Brandon Boston Jr. SG	Recruit ratings: Rivals: 247Sports: ESPN: (96)				
Overall recruit ranking: Rivals: 5 247Sports: 6 ESPN: 7
Note: In many cases, Scout, Rivals, 247Sports, On3, and ESPN may conflict in their listings of height and weight.; In these cases, the average was taken. ESPN grades are on a 100-point scale.; Sources: "Kentucky 2020 Basketball Commitments". Rivals.; "2020 Kentucky Wildcats Recruiting Class". ESPN.; "2020 Team Ranking". Rivals.

== College career ==
In his college debut on November 25, 2020, Boston posted 15 points and seven rebounds in an 81–45 win over Morehead State. He scored 21 points in the season finale win against South Carolina. As a freshman, he averaged 11.5 points and 4.5 rebounds per game. On March 20, 2021, Boston declared for the 2021 NBA draft, forgoing his remaining college eligibility.

== Professional career ==
=== Los Angeles / Agua Caliente / Ontario Clippers (2021–2024) ===
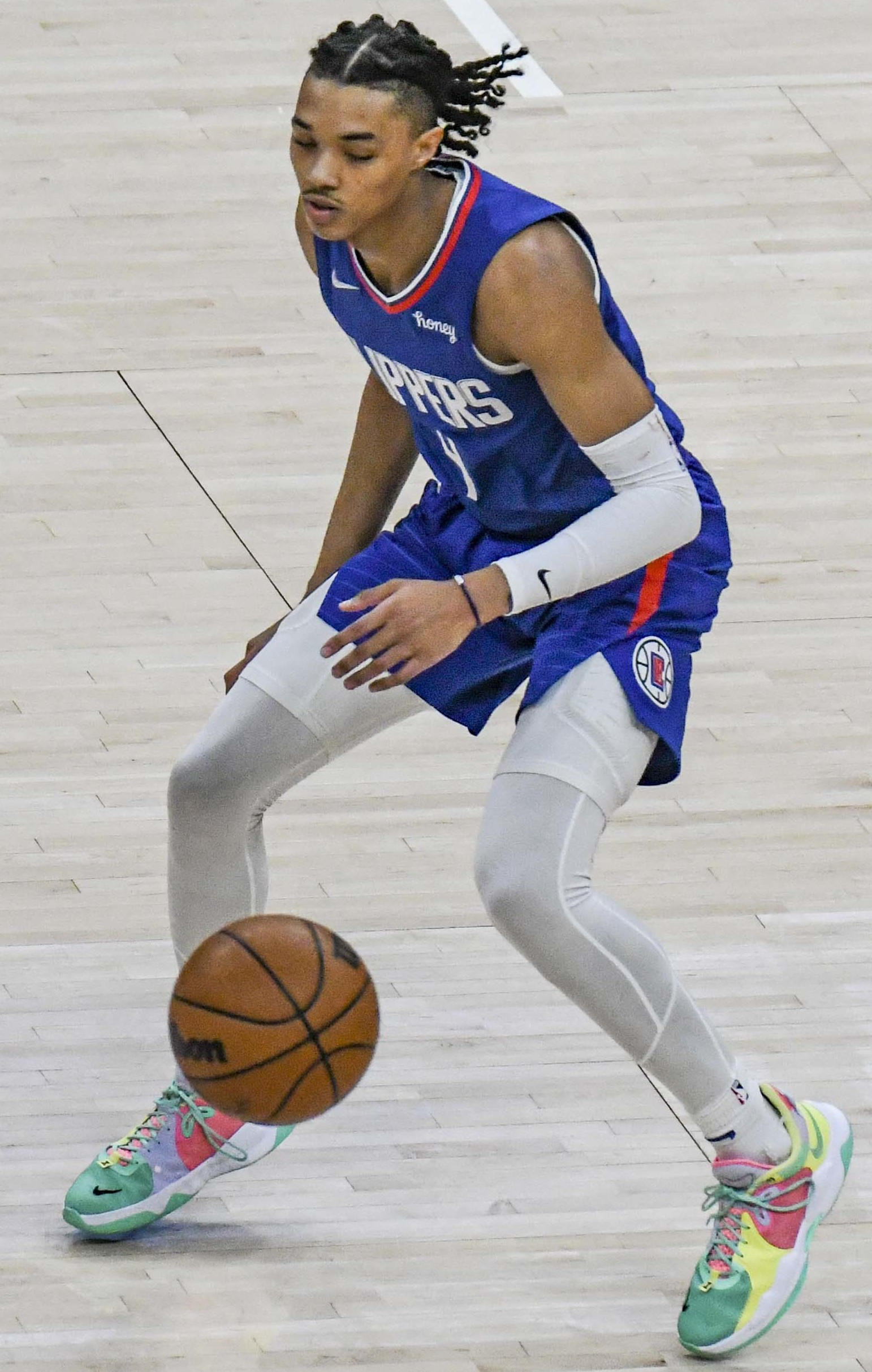
Boston with the Los Angeles Clippers in 2022

Boston was selected in the second round of the 2021 NBA draft with the 51st pick by the Memphis Grizzlies, then traded to the Los Angeles Clippers via the New Orleans Pelicans.

Boston was assigned to the Clippers' NBA G League affiliate, the Agua Caliente Clippers, for their G League season-opener. Boston helped the since-relocated Ontario Clippers win the G League Winter Showcase championship in 2022, earning Showcase Cup MVP honors after scoring 21 points in the final.

On August 8, 2024, Boston signed with the San Antonio Spurs, but was waived on October 19.

=== New Orleans Pelicans (2024–2025) ===
On October 21, 2024, Boston was claimed off waivers by the New Orleans Pelicans, who later converted his deal into a two-way contract. On February 26, 2025, the Pelicans signed Boston to a standard, two-year contract. He made 42 appearances (10 starts) for New Orleans during the 2024–25 NBA season, averaging 10.7 points, 3.2 rebounds, and 2.2 assists. On April 28, it was announced that Boston had undergone arthroscopic surgery on his left ankle. On June 29, the Pelicans declined their team option on Boston, making him an unrestricted free agent.

=== Fenerbahçe (2025–2026) ===
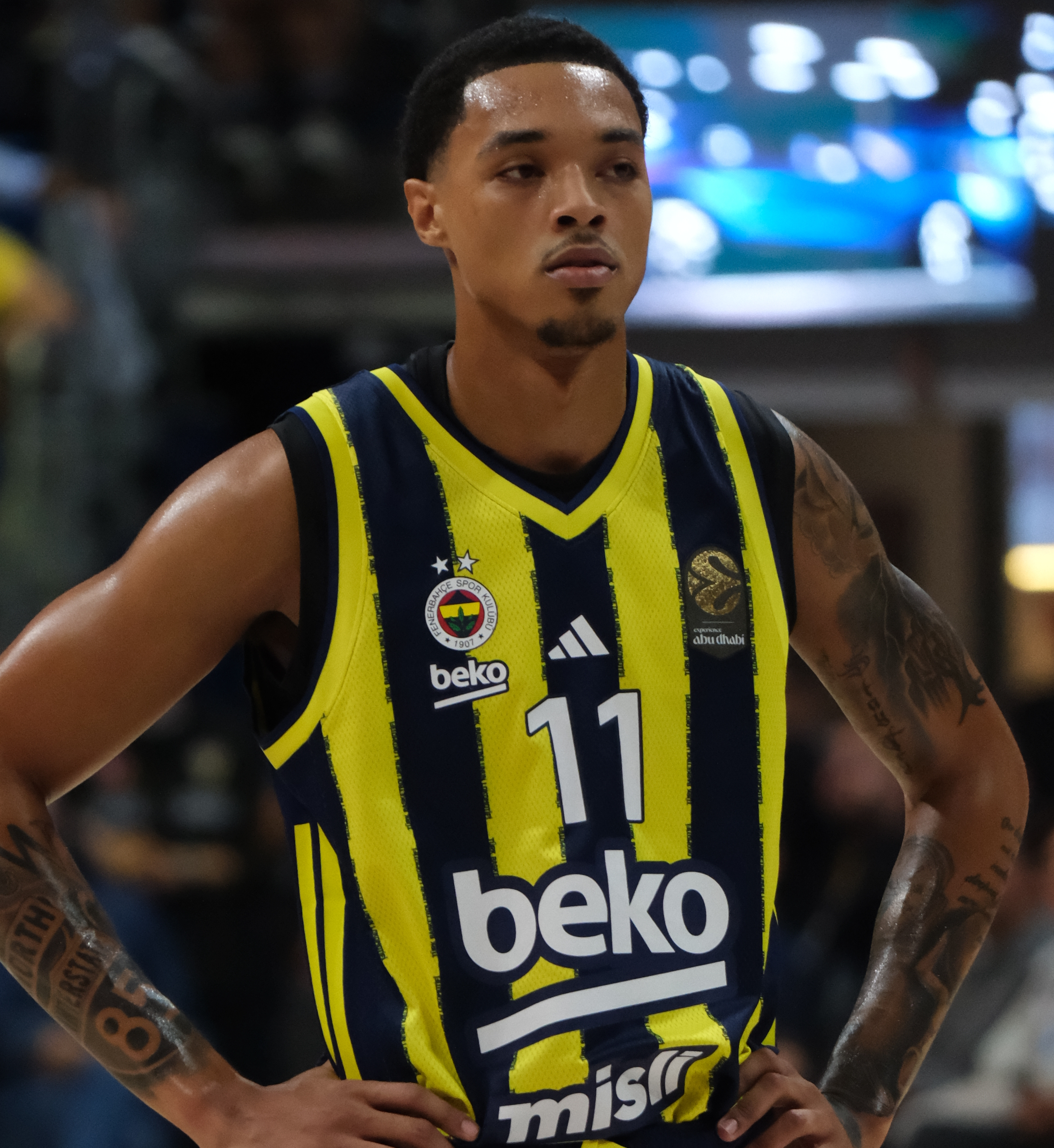
Boston with Fenerbahçe in 2025

On August 4, 2025, Boston signed with Turkish powerhouse Fenerbahçe of the Basketbol Süper Ligi (BSL) and the EuroLeague.

On October 1, 2025, he made his EuroLeague debut against Paris Basketball in a 96-77 victory with 5 points, 3 rebounds and 1 steal in 8.4 mins.

On December 7, 2025, in a 2025–26 Basketbol Süper Ligi away match against Yukatel Merkezefendi Basket, Boston tallied a season-high 21 points, 7 rebounds and 1 assist in 27 mins.

On September 25, 2026, the Chicago Bulls announced that Boston was part of their training camp roster. On October 17, he was waived by the Bulls.

=== Trabzonsport (2026–present) ===
On October 30, 2026, he signed with Trabzonspor of the Turkish Basketbol Süper Ligi (BSL).

== Career statistics ==
Legend
GP	Games played	GS	Games started	MPG	Minutes per game
FG%	Field goal percentage	3P%	3-point field goal percentage	FT%	Free throw percentage
RPG	Rebounds per game	APG	Assists per game	SPG	Steals per game
BPG	Blocks per game	PPG	Points per game	**Bold**	Career high

=== NBA ===
==== Regular season ====
Year	Team	GP	GS	MPG	FG%	3P%	FT%	RPG	APG	SPG	BPG	PPG
2021–22	L.A. Clippers	**51**	0	14.9	.385	.306	**.819**	2.2	1.0	.5	**.3**	6.7
2022–23	L.A. Clippers	22	1	11.3	.418	**.414**	.763	1.4	.9	.4	.0	6.5
2023–24	L.A. Clippers	32	0	10.8	.404	.269	.697	1.6	.4	.3	**.3**	5.2
2024–25	New Orleans	42	**10**	**23.6**	**.436**	.350	.788	**3.2**	**2.2**	**1.3**	.2	**10.7**
Career		147	11	16.0	.412	.328	.781	2.2	1.2	.7	.2	7.5

==== Playoffs ====
Year	Team	GP	GS	MPG	FG%	3P%	FT%	RPG	APG	SPG	BPG	PPG
2023	L.A. Clippers	1	0	1.0	—	—	—	.0	.0	.0	.0	.0
2024	L.A. Clippers	**3**	0	**3.2**	.500	—	.500	**.7**	**.3**	.0	.0	**1.7**
Career		4	0	2.7	.500	—	.500	.5	.3	.0	.0	1.3

=== College ===
Year	Team	GP	GS	MPG	FG%	3P%	FT%	RPG	APG	SPG	BPG	PPG
2020–21	Kentucky	25	24	30.3	.355	.300	.785	4.5	1.6	1.3	.2	11.5

=== EuroLeague ===
As of match played 6 May 2026

Year	Team	GP	GS	MPG	FG%	3P%	FT%	RPG	APG	SPG	BPG	PPG	PIR
2025–26	Fenerbahçe	28	2	11.5	.547	.326	.769	1.6	.3	.5	.0	4.8	3.8

== Personal life ==
After a workout with Kentucky teammate Terrence Clarke on April 22, 2021, Clarke was involved in a car crash in Los Angeles, California. Clarke, driving by himself, was killed while Boston, in the car behind of Clarke, witnessed the crash.

He also keeps a dollar bill in his shoe during games.
