= Forest Sale =

American basketball player and politician

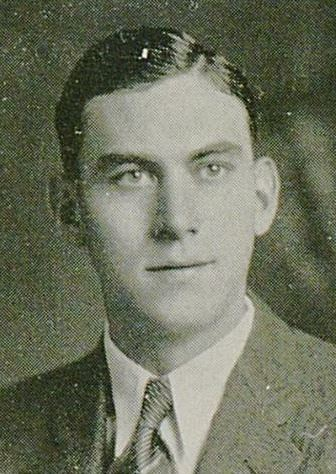
- Sale as a senior at Kentucky

Personal information
- Born: June 25, 1911 Lawrenceburg, Kentucky, U.S.
- Died: December 4, 1985 (aged 74) Lexington, Kentucky, U.S.
- Listed height: 6 ft 4 in (1.93 m)

Career information
- High school: Kavanaugh (Lawrenceburg, Kentucky)
- College: Kentucky (1930–1933)
- Position: Power forward / center

Career highlights
- Helms Player of the Year (1933); 2× Consensus All-American (1932, 1933); First-team All-SEC (1933)

Member of the Kentucky House of Representatives from the 55th district
- In office January 1, 1972 – January 1, 1982
- Preceded by: David L. Van Horn (redistricting)
- Succeeded by: Tom Jones

Forest E. "Aggie" Sale (June 25, 1911 – December 4, 1985) was an American college basketball player at the University of Kentucky from 1930 to 1933. He played for coach Adolph Rupp and was one of Rupp's first NCAA All-Americans.

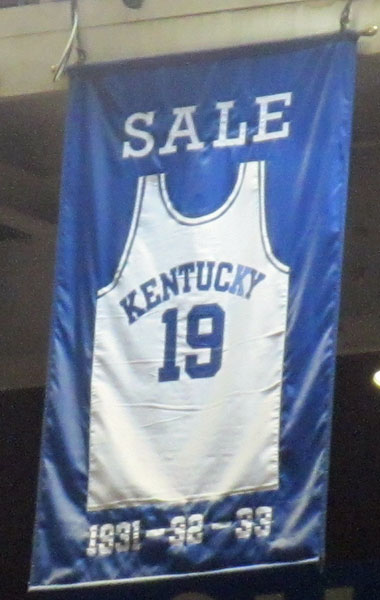
A jersey honoring Sale hangs in Rupp Arena.

Sale attended Kavanaugh High School in Anderson County, Kentucky prior to matriculating at the University of Kentucky. As a 6 ft 4 in (1.93 m) forward/center, he was a rather tall player for his era. Sale used his height to his advantage and was noted as both a good scorer and rebounder. In his three seasons with the Wildcats team, Sale played in 50 career games and scored 657 points. He was twice named a consensus All-American, and as a senior in 1932–33 Sale was selected as the Helms Athletic Foundation (HAF) National Player of the Year. That year, Kentucky won the Southeastern Conference regular season and SEC Tournament titles and finished with a 21–3 overall record. In addition, the team was later retroactively named a national champion by the Helms Athletic Foundation, although Helms findings are not officially recognized by the NCAA.

After college, Sale became a high school history teacher and basketball coach before joining the United States Navy and fighting in World War II for a year. He returned to being a teacher and coach, and then from 1964 to 1967 he ran his own Sale Sporting Goods Store. He entered politics in 1971 as a Democrat and was elected to the Kentucky House of Representatives from the 55th District. Sale was re-elected four times before ending his political career.

Forest Sale died of a heart attack on December 4, 1985, at St. Joseph Hospital in Lexington, Kentucky.

== See also ==
- Honored Kentucky Wildcats men's basketball players
