= Masterson Station, Lexington =

Masterson Station
- Neighborhood of Lexington, Kentucky
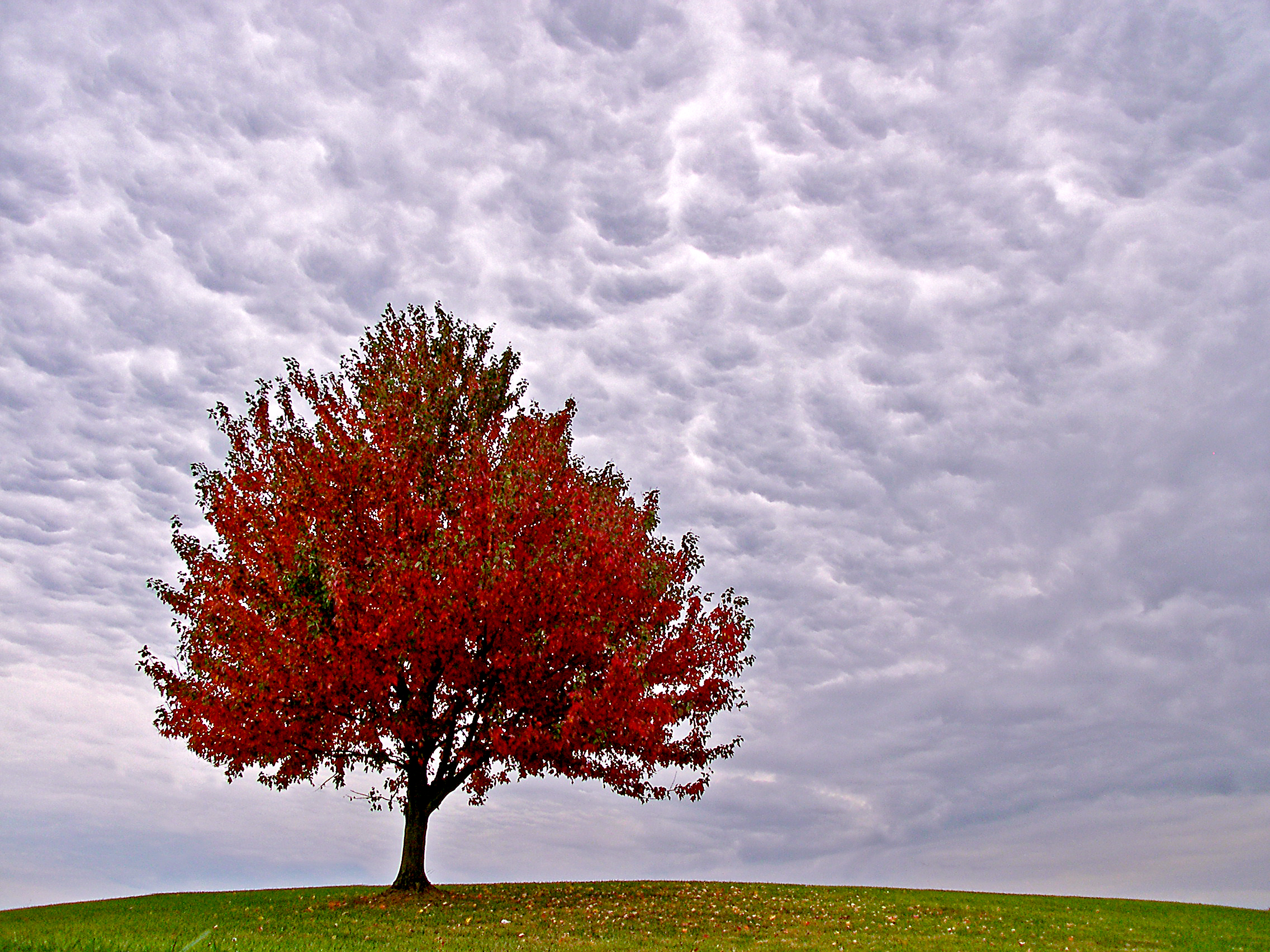
- Masterson Station Park
- Interactive map of Masterson Station
- Coordinates: 38.096°N 84.542°W
- Country: United States
- State: Kentucky
- County: Fayette
- City: Lexington

Area
  - Total: 0.77600 sq mi (2.00983 km^{2})

Population (2021)
  - Total: 33,696
  - Density: 1,193/sq mi (461/km^{2})
- Time zone: UTC-5 (Eastern (EST))
  - Summer (DST): UTC-4 (EDT)
- ZIP code: 40511
- Area code: 859
- Website: mastersonstation.org

Masterson Station is a neighborhood in northwestern Lexington, Kentucky, United States. Its boundaries are Masterson Station Park on the west, Leestown Road to the south, Greendale Road to the east, and Spurr Road to the north.

== Neighborhood statistics ==
- Area: 0.776 square miles (2.01 km^{2})
- Population: 33,696
- Population density: 1,193 people per square mile (461 people/km^{2})
- Median household income: $71,699
