= 2019–20 Coastal Carolina Chanticleers women's basketball team =

American college basketball season

2019–20 Coastal Carolina Chanticleers women's basketball
- Conference: Sun Belt Conference
- Record: 25–4 (15–3 Sun Belt)
- Head coach: Jaida Williams (7th season)
- Assistant coaches: Vanessa Taylor; Stephanie McCormick; AJ Jordan
- Home arena: HTC Center

2019–20 Sun Belt Conference women's basketball standings
	Conf.				Overall
Team	W		L	PCT	W		L	PCT
Troy*	16	–	2	.889	25	–	4	.862
Coastal Carolina	15	–	3	.833	25	–	4	.862
UT Arlington	14	–	4	.778	21	–	11	.656
Louisiana	10	–	8	.556	19	–	12	.613
South Alabama	9	–	9	.500	16	–	16	.500
Little Rock	9	–	9	.500	12	–	19	.387
Arkansas State	8	–	10	.444	12	–	18	.400
Appalachian State	8	–	10	.444	11	–	19	.367
Georgia Southern	7	–	11	.389	10	–	19	.345
Texas State	6	–	12	.333	13	–	17	.433
Georgia State	5	–	13	.278	8	–	21	.276
Louisiana–Monroe	1	–	17	.056	3	–	26	.103
† 2020 Sun Belt tournament winner

The 2019–20 Coastal Carolina Chanticleers women's basketball team represented Coastal Carolina University in the 2019–20 NCAA Division I women's basketball season. The Chanticleers, led by seventh-year head coach Jaida Williams, played their home games at HTC Center in Conway, South Carolina and were members of the Sun Belt Conference. They finished the season 25–4, 15–3 in Sun Belt play, to finish in second place. They advanced to the second round of the Sun Belt women's tournament where they lost to Appalachian State. They received first- and second-round byes in the postseason tournament and were scheduled to play South Alabama, but it was canceled due to the COVID-19 pandemic before the Chanticleers had the opportunity to play.

== Preseason ==
=== Sun Belt coaches poll ===
On October 30, 2019, the Sun Belt released their preseason coaches poll with the Chanticleers predicted to finish in seventh place in the conference.

Predicted finish	Team	Votes (1st place)
1	Little Rock	127 (6)
2	Troy	123 (4)
3	UT Arlington	120 (1)
4	South Alabama	119 (1)
5	Appalachian State	100
6	Georgia State	73
7	Coastal Carolina	66
8	Louisiana	64
9	Texas State	59
10	Arkansas State	44
11	Georgia Southern	26
12	Louisiana–Monroe	15

=== Sun Belt Preseason All-Conference team ===
1st team
- DJ Williams – SR, Guard

== Roster ==
2019–20 Coastal Carolina Chanticleers women's basketball team
Players
Coaches

Pos.	#	Name	Height	Year	Previous school	Hometown
G	0	Alana Denson	5 ft 7 in (1.7 m)	Fr	Forest Park HS	Atlanta, GA
G	3	Torrie Cash	5 ft 6 in (1.68 m)	Sr	Vincentian Academy; Monroe CC	Pittsburgh, PA
G	4	Tiarra Davis	5 ft 6 in (1.68 m)	Jr	Holy Names Catholic	Windsor, ON
C	10	Janeen Camp	6 ft 5 in (1.96 m)	So	TPLS Christian Academy	Portsmouth, VA
G	11	Kiara Norman	5 ft 4 in (1.63 m)	Jr	Norfolk Christian	Virginia Beach, VA
G	14	Kaylin West	5 ft 7 in (1.7 m)	Jr	IMG Academy	Bethlehem, PA
F	20	Janae Camp	6 ft 1 in (1.85 m)	Jr	TPLS Christian Academy	Portsmouth, VA
F	21	Aja Blount	5 ft 11 in (1.8 m)	So	IMG Academy	Northampton, PA
G	22	Zacharyia Esmon	5 ft 9 in (1.75 m)	Jr	Summit HS	Franklin, TN
G	23	Caitlin Roche	5 ft 8 in (1.73 m)	Sr	IHA Academy; ASA College/Robert Morris	Montvale, NJ
C	30	Naheria Hamilton	6 ft 4 in (1.93 m)	Sr	Eastern Wayne HS	Goldsboro, NC
G	32	DJ Williams	5 ft 10 in (1.78 m)	Sr	JW North HS	Moreno Valley, CA
C	40	Bailey Lewis	6 ft 5 in (1.96 m)	Fr	Liberty Christian HS	Sanger, TX
F	54	Alise Davis	5 ft 11 in (1.8 m)	Jr	Tampa Catholic	Tampa, FL

Head coach

- Jaida Williams (Cal Poly Pomona)

Assistant coach(es)

- Vanessa Taylor (Tuskegee)
- Stephanie McCormick (Catawba)
- AJ Jordan (Coastal Carolina)

Legend

- (C) Team captain
- (S) Suspended
- (I) Ineligible
- (W) Walk-on
- Injured
- Current redshirt

Roster
Last update: July 2, 2024

== Schedule ==
Date time, TV	Rank^{#}	Opponent^{#}	Result	Record	High points	High rebounds	High assists	Site (attendance) city, state
Non-conference regular season
November 8, 2019*; 5:00 p.m., ESPN+		Arkansas–Pine Bluff	W 76–69	1–0	22 – Hamilton	15 – Hamilton	6 – Cash	HTC Center (505); Conway, SC
November 13, 2019*; 6:00 p.m., ESPN+		UNC Greensboro	W 63–54	2–0	20 – Esmon	7 – Williams	3 – Powell	HTC Center (225); Conway, SC
November 17, 2019*; 2:00 p.m.		at Wofford	W 78–73	3–0	30 – Blount	10 – Camp	2 – Cash	Jerry Richardson Indoor Stadium (719); Spartanburg, SC
November 24, 2019*; 2:00 p.m., ESPN+		at Western Carolina	W 66–43	4–0	16 – Blount	8 – Williams	3 – Cash	Liston B. Ramsey Center (261); Cullowhee, NC
November 29, 2019*; 2:00 p.m.		Richmond; Coastal Carolina Thanksgiving Classic	L 67–79	4–1	19 – Blount	7 – Williams	6 – Williams	HTC Center (332); Conway, SC
December 1, 2019*; 2:00 p.m.		George Mason; Coastal Carolina Thanksgiving Classic	W 74–59	5–1	17 – Williams	10 – Camp	3 – Camp	HTC Center (156); Conway, SC
December 5, 2018*; 7:00 p.m.		UNC Pembroke	W 86–44	6–1	18 – Blount	11 – Hamilton	5 – Williams	HTC Center (256); Conway, SC
December 8, 2019*; 2:00 p.m.		at UNC Wilmington	W 62–43	7–1	17 – Williams	12 – Hamilton	4 – Williams	Trask Coliseum (847); Wilmington, NC
December 12, 2019*; 7:00 p.m.		Wesleyan College	W 132–32	8–1	19 – Davis	9 – Lewis	6 – Denson	HTC Center (196); Conway, SC
December 19, 2019*; 5:30 p.m.		vs. Elon; Philanthropist.com Carolinas Challenge	W 76–65	9–1	27 – Williams	9 – Williams	5 – Williams	Myrtle Beach Convention Center; Myrtle Beach, SC
December 29, 2019*; 2:00 p.m., ESPN+		South Carolina State	W 85–44	10–1	22 – Blount	11 – Blount	4 – Cash	HTC Center (202); Conway, SC
Sun Belt regular season
January 2, 2020; 7:00 p.m.		at Troy	L 77–84	10–2 (0–1)	21 – Williams	10 – Camp	2 – Camp	Trojan Arena (1,439); Troy, AL
January 4, 2020; 3:00 p.m.		at South Alabama	W 71–62	11–2 (1–1)	38 – Blount	8 – Hamilton	2 – Cash	Mitchell Center (272); Mobile, AL
January 9, 2020; 6:00 p.m., ESPN+		Texas State	W 75–67	12–2 (2–1)	29 – Williams	11 – Hamilton	3 – Cash	HTC Center (199); Conway, SC
January 11, 2020; 2:00 p.m., ESPN+		UT Arlington	W 62–56	13–2 (3–1)	21 – Williams	9 – Cash	4 – Blount	HTC Center (297); Conway, SC
January 15, 2020; 7:30 p.m., ESPN+		at Little Rock	W 64–48	14–2 (4–1)	16 – Cash	12 – Hamilton	11 – Williams	Jack Stephens Center (593); Little Rock, AR
January 18, 2020; 2:00 p.m., ESPN+		at Appalachian State	W 80–53	15–2 (5–1)	31 – Williams	10 – Williams	4 – Williams	Holmes Convocation Center (723); Boone, NC
January 25, 2020; 5:00 p.m., ESPN+		at Arkansas State	L 61–63	15–3 (5–2)	14 – Hamilton	14 – Hamilton	10 – Williams	First National Bank Arena (646); Jonesboro, AR
January 30, 2020; 6:00 p.m., ESPN+		Georgia Southern	W 66–59	16–3 (6–2)	25 – Williams	14 – Hamilton	4 – Cash	HTC Center (195); Conway, SC
February 1, 2020; 2:00 p.m., ESPN+		Georgia State	W 87–45	17–3 (7–2)	22 – Williams	17 – Hamilton	7 – Williams	HTC Center (491); Conway, SC
February 6, 2020; 8:00 p.m., ESPN+		at Texas State	W 69–59	18–3 (8–2)	18 – Hamilton	14 – Hamilton	5 – Cash	Strahan Arena (1,209); San Marcos, TX
February 8, 2020; 3:00 p.m., ESPN+		at UT Arlington	W 80–62	19–3 (9–2)	20 – Williams	23 – Hamilton	6 – Cash	College Park Center (1,104); Arlington, TX
February 13, 2020; 6:00 p.m., ESPN+		Troy	W 124–103	20–3 (10–2)	51 – Williams	11 – Camp	8 – Williams	HTC Center (747); Conway, SC
February 15, 2020; 2:00 p.m., ESPN+		South Alabama	W 76–73	21–3 (11–2)	22 – Williams	14 – Williams	10 – Williams	HTC Center (317); Conway, SC
February 20, 2020; 6:30 p.m., ESPN+		at Georgia Southern	W 90–74	22–3 (12–2)	29 – Blount	14 – Blount	7 – Williams	Hanner Fieldhouse (371); Statesboro, GA
February 22, 2020; 2:00 p.m., ESPN+		at Georgia State	W 66–50	23–3 (13–2)	23 – Blount	10 – Blount	7 – Williams	GSU Sports Arena (591); Atlanta, GA
February 27, 2020; 6:00 p.m., ESPN+		Louisiana–Monroe	W 88–69	24–3 (14–2)	25 – Hamilton	14 – Hamilton	10 – Williams	HTC Center (347); Conway, SC
February 29, 2020; 2:00 p.m., ESPN+		Louisiana	W 83–74	25–3 (15–2)	24 – Williams	10 – Camp	14 – Williams	HTC Center (317); Conway, SC
March 7, 2020; 2:00 p.m., ESPN+		Appalachian State	L 80–83 ^{2OT}	25–4 (15–3)	38 – Williams	18 – Hamilton	5 – Cash	HTC Center (503); Conway, SC
Sun Belt women's tournament
March 14, 2020; 8:30 p.m.	(2)	(6) South Alabama; Semifinals	Tournament cancelled due to COVID-19 pandemic					Smoothie King Center; New Orleans, LA
*Non-conference game. ^{#}Rankings from AP poll. (#) Tournament seedings in parentheses. All times are in Eastern.

== See also ==
- 2019–20 Coastal Carolina Chanticleers men's basketball team
