= 2019–20 Appalachian State Mountaineers women's basketball team =

Intercollegiate basketball season

2019–20 Appalachian State Mountaineers women's basketball
- Conference: Sun Belt Conference
- Record: 11–19 (8–10 Sun Belt)
- Head coach: Angel Elderkin (6th season)
- Assistant coaches: Kate Dempsey; Sam Pierce Jr.; Cristina Centeno
- Home arena: Holmes Center

2019–20 Sun Belt Conference women's basketball standings
	Conf.				Overall
Team	W		L	PCT	W		L	PCT
Troy*	16	–	2	.889	25	–	4	.862
Coastal Carolina	15	–	3	.833	25	–	4	.862
UT Arlington	14	–	4	.778	21	–	11	.656
Louisiana	10	–	8	.556	19	–	12	.613
South Alabama	9	–	9	.500	16	–	16	.500
Little Rock	9	–	9	.500	12	–	19	.387
Arkansas State	8	–	10	.444	12	–	18	.400
Appalachian State	8	–	10	.444	11	–	19	.367
Georgia Southern	7	–	11	.389	10	–	19	.345
Texas State	6	–	12	.333	13	–	17	.433
Georgia State	5	–	13	.278	8	–	21	.276
Louisiana–Monroe	1	–	17	.056	3	–	26	.103
† 2020 Sun Belt tournament winner

The 2019–20 Appalachian State Mountaineers women's basketball team represented Appalachian State University in the 2019–20 NCAA Division I women's basketball season. The Mountaineers, led by sixth year head coach Angel Elderkin, played their home games at George M. Holmes Convocation Center and were members of the Sun Belt Conference. They finished the season 11–18, 8–10 in Sun Belt play to finish in eighth place. The Mountaineers were eliminated in the First Round of the Sun Belt tournament to Little Rock by the score of 47–48. Shortly after being eliminated, the Sun Belt canceled the tournament due to the COVID-19 pandemic, which was followed shortly by the NCAA cancelling all post-season play.

== Preseason ==
=== Sun Belt coaches poll ===
On October 30, 2019, the Sun Belt released their preseason coaches poll with the Mountaineers predicted to finish in fifth place in the conference.

Predicted finish	Team	Votes (1st place)
1	Little Rock	127 (6)
2	Troy	123 (4)
3	UT Arlington	120 (1)
4	South Alabama	119 (1)
5	Appalachian State	100
6	Georgia State	73
7	Coastal Carolina	66
8	Louisiana	64
9	Texas State	59
10	Arkansas State	44
11	Georgia Southern	26
12	Louisiana–Monroe	15

=== Sun Belt Preseason All-Conference team ===
2nd team

- Bayley Plummer – SR, Center

3rd team

- Pre Stanley – JR, Guard

== Roster ==
2019–20 Appalachian State Mountaineers women's basketball team
Players
Coaches

Pos.	#	Name	Height	Year	Previous school	Hometown
F	1	Maya Calder	6 ft 0 in (1.83 m)	Jr	National Christian Academy	Landover, MD
F	2	A'Lea Gilbert	6 ft 0 in (1.83 m)	RS Fr	South Mecklenburg	Charlotte, NC
G	3	Tierra Wilson	5 ft 8 in (1.73 m)	Jr	RJ Reynolds	Winston-Salem, NC
G	4	Nicola Mathews	5 ft 8 in (1.73 m)	Sr	Cabra Dominican; College of Central Florida	Adelaide, Australia
G	5	Pre Stanley	5 ft 9 in (1.75 m)	Jr	Rockledge	Rockledge, FL
G	10	Michaela Porter	5 ft 10 in (1.78 m)	Jr	Obama Academy	Pittsburgh, PA
G/F	14	Armani Hampton	5 ft 11 in (1.8 m)	Sr	Atkins	Winston-Salem, NC
F	15	Emma Newton	5 ft 9 in (1.75 m)	So	Asheville Christian Academy	Asheville, NC
G	20	Brooke Bigott	5 ft 10 in (1.78 m)	So	Seven Lakes	Katy, TX
G	23	Ashley Polacek	5 ft 5 in (1.65 m)	RS Sr	SPIRE Institute; UCF	Ottawa, ON
G	24	Janay Sanders	5 ft 10 in (1.78 m)	So	Mallard Creek HS	Charlotte, NC
F	30	Lainey Gosnell	6 ft 1 in (1.85 m)	Jr	Habersham Central	Demorest, GA
F/C	42	Bayley Plummer	6 ft 4 in (1.93 m)	Sr	East Davidson	Thomasville, NC
F	44	Halie McDonald	6 ft 2 in (1.88 m)	So	Millbrook	Winchester, VA
F	50	Jackie Christ	6 ft 3 in (1.91 m)	Fr	Dominion HS	Sterling, VA

Head coach

- Angel Elderkin (Southern Maine)

Assistant coach(es)

- Kate Dempsey (Wofford)
- Sam Pierce Jr. (Slippery Rock)
- Cristina Centeno (Siena)

Legend

- (C) Team captain
- (S) Suspended
- (I) Ineligible
- (W) Walk-on
- Injured
- Current redshirt

Roster
Last update: 3 August 2020

== Schedule ==
Date time, TV	Rank^{#}	Opponent^{#}	Result	Record	High points	High rebounds	High assists	Site (attendance) city, state
Non-conference regular season
Nov 5, 2019*; 11:00 am, ESPN+		at VCU	L 36–66	0–1	11 – Stanley	8 – Gosnell	4 – Bigott	Siegel Center (894); Richmond, VA
Nov 13, 2019*; 7:00 pm		at Elon	L 66–67 ^{OT}	0–2	20 – Stanley	23 – Plummer	2 – Plummer	Schar Center (795); Elon, NC
Nov 17, 2019*; 2:00 pm, SECN+		at No. 6 South Carolina	L 50–92	0–3	13 – Polacek	10 – TEAM	2 – Bigott	Colonial Life Arena (10,498); Columbia, SC
Nov 22, 2019*; 6:30 pm, ESPN+		Gardner–Webb	L 56–67	0–4	24 – Stanley	11 – Hampton	4 – Polacek	Holmes Center (468); Boone, NC
Nov 25, 2019*; 6:30 pm, ESPN+		East Tennessee State	L 61–67	0–5	22 – Stanley	11 – Hampton	4 – Polacek	Holmes Center (253); Boone, NC
Nov 29, 2019*; 6:30 pm		Mercer	W 77–68	1–5	21 – Stanley	13 – Plummer	5 – Polacek	Holmes Center (236); Boone, NC
Dec 4, 2019*; 7:00 pm, ESPN+		at Wofford	W 54–51	2–5	14 – Gosnell	16 – Plummer	4 – Polacek	Jerry Richardson Indoor Stadium (712); Spartanburg, SC
Dec 14, 2019*; 3:30 pm, BTN+		at Michigan	L 35–62	2–6	11 – McDonald	8 – Stanley	2 – Stanley	Crisler Center (2,608); Ann Arbor, MI
Dec 19, 2019*; 3:00 pm		vs. Bethune–Cookman; Hatter Classic	L 44–61	2–7	21 – Polacek	7 – Gosnell	3 – Stanley	Edmunds Center (57); DeLand, FL
Dec 20, 2019*; 1:00 pm		vs. Canisius; Hatter Classic	W 74–57	3–7	20 – Polacek	9 – Gosnell	6 – Stanley	Edmunds Center (102); DeLand, FL
Dec 29, 2019*; 2:00 pm, ESPN+		at UNC Greensboro	L 47–54	3–8	12 – Bigott	13 – Plummer	4 – Polacek	Fleming Gymnasium (314); Greensboro, NC
Sun Belt regular season
Jan 2, 2020; 8:00 pm, ESPN+		at South Alabama	L 61–88	3–9 (0–1)	19 – Stanley	15 – Plummer	3 – Mathews	Mitchell Center (308); Mobile, AL
Jan 4, 2020; 3:00 pm, ESPN+		at Troy	L 55–84	3–10 (0–2)	22 – Polacek	11 – Plummer	2 – Stanley	Trojan Arena (1,112); Troy, AL
Jan 9, 2020; 6:30 pm, ESPN+		UT Arlington	L 60–82	3–11 (0–3)	14 – Stanley	7 – TEAM	2 – Hampton	Holmes Center (436); Boone, NC
Jan 11, 2020; 2:00 pm		Texas State; Mountain Cheer Day	W 73–65 ^{OT}	4–11 (1–3)	25 – Stanley	9 – McDonald	6 – Bigott	Holmes Center (489); Boone, NC
Jan 16, 2020; 8:00 pm, ESPN+		at Arkansas State	L 58–76	4–12 (1–4)	18 – Mathews	4 – Stanley	6 – Bigott	First National Bank Arena (619); Jonesboro, AR
Jan 18, 2020; 2:00 pm		Coastal Carolina; Yosef's Birthday Party	L 53–80	4–13 (1–5)	13 – Polacek	5 – Bigott	4 – Bigott	Holmes Center (723); Boone, NC
Jan 25, 2020; 3:00 pm, ESPN+		at Little Rock	L 63–68	4–14 (1–6)	21 – Polacek	9 – Plummer	4 – Polacek	Jack Stephens Center (1,009); Little Rock, AR
Jan 30, 2020; 6:30 pm, ESPN+		Georgia State; Hoops & Scoops	W 65–37	5–14 (2–6)	15 – Stanley	8 – Plummer	7 – Polacek	Holmes Center (406); Boone, NC
Feb 1, 2020; 2:00 pm, ESPN+		Georgia Southern; Pink Game	W 83–75	6–14 (3–6)	18 – Stanley	15 – Plummer	7 – Stanley	Holmes Center (576); Boone, NC
Feb 6, 2020; 8:00 pm, ESPN+		at UT Arlington	L 44–63	6–15 (3–7)	14 – Stanley	12 – Plummer	4 – Polacek	College Park Center (988); Arlington, TX
Feb 8, 2020; 3:00 pm, ESPN+		at Texas State	W 59–47	7–15 (4–7)	14 – Plummer	14 – Plummer	5 – Polacek	Strahan Coliseum (1,045); San Marcos, TX
Feb 13, 2020; 12:00 pm, ESPN+		South Alabama; Education Day	W 71–59	8–15 (5–7)	19 – Stanley	15 – Plummer	7 – Polacek	Holmes Center (1,224); Boone, NC
Feb 15, 2020; 2:00 pm, ESPN+		Troy; Singles Day	L 61–81	8–16 (5–8)	13 – Gosnell	16 – Plummer	4 – Bigott	Holmes Center (568); Boone, NC
Feb 20, 2020; 6:00 pm, ESPN+		at Georgia State	W 64–59 ^{OT}	9–16 (6–8)	24 – Gosnell	24 – Plummer	6 – Polacek	GSU Sports Arena (416); Atlanta, GA
Feb 22, 2020; 2:00 pm, ESPN+		at Georgia Southern	L 70–78	9–17 (6–9)	23 – Stanley	9 – Plummer	4 – Bigott	Hanner Fieldhouse (513); Statesboro, GA
Feb 27, 2020; 6:30 pm, ESPN+		Louisiana; Fan App Day	L 51–57	9–18 (6–10)	14 – Porter	13 – Plummer	4 – Polacek	Holmes Center (803); Boone, NC
Feb 29, 2020; 2:00 pm, ESPN+		Louisiana–Monroe; Senior Day	W 68–49	10–18 (7–10)	17 – Porter	11 – Plummer	2 – Mathews	Holmes Center (847); Boone, NC
Mar 7, 2020; 2:00 pm, ESPN+		at Coastal Carolina	W 83–80 ^{2OT}	11–18 (8–10)	28 – Stanley	21 – Plummer	5 – Polacek	HTC Center (503); Conway, SC
Sun Belt Women's Tournament
Mar 10, 2020; 4:00 pm, ESPN+	(8)	vs. (5) Little Rock; First Round	L 47–48	11–19	18 – Gosnell	11 – Gosnell	4 – Polacek	Cajundome (169); Lafayette, LA
*Non-conference game. ^{#}Rankings from AP Poll. (#) Tournament seedings in parentheses. All times are in Eastern Time.

== See also ==
2019–20 Appalachian State Mountaineers men's basketball team
