= 2020 Sun Belt Conference women's basketball tournament =

- Classification: Division I
- Season: 2019–20
- Teams: 10
- Site: Smoothie King Center; New Orleans, Louisiana
- Champions: None
- Television: ESPN+, ESPN3

2019–20 Sun Belt Conference women's basketball standings
	Conf.				Overall
Team	W		L	PCT	W		L	PCT
Troy*	16	–	2	.889	25	–	4	.862
Coastal Carolina	15	–	3	.833	25	–	4	.862
UT Arlington	14	–	4	.778	21	–	11	.656
Louisiana	10	–	8	.556	19	–	12	.613
South Alabama	9	–	9	.500	16	–	16	.500
Little Rock	9	–	9	.500	12	–	19	.387
Arkansas State	8	–	10	.444	12	–	18	.400
Appalachian State	8	–	10	.444	11	–	19	.367
Georgia Southern	7	–	11	.389	10	–	19	.345
Texas State	6	–	12	.333	13	–	17	.433
Georgia State	5	–	13	.278	8	–	21	.276
Louisiana–Monroe	1	–	17	.056	3	–	26	.103
† 2020 Sun Belt tournament winner

The 2020 Sun Belt Conference women's basketball tournament was the postseason women's basketball tournament for the Sun Belt Conference scheduled to be held from March 10 to March 15, 2020, at the Smoothie King Center in New Orleans. The winner of the tournament would have received a first-round bye to the 2020 NCAA tournament. On March 12, the NCAA announced that the tournament was cancelled due to the coronavirus pandemic.

== Seeds ==
2020 Sun Belt women's basketball tournament seeds and results
Seed	School	Conf.	Over.	Tiebreaker
1	Troy	16–2	25–4	
2	Coastal Carolina	15–3	25–4	
3	UT Arlington	14–4	20–10	
4	Louisiana	10–8	17–12	
5	Little Rock	9–9	12–18	
6	South Alabama	9–9	14–16	
7	Arkansas State	8–10	11–18	
8	Appalachian State	8–10	11–19	
9	Georgia Southern	7–11	10–19	
10	Texas State	6–12	13–16	
‡ – Sun Belt Conference regular season champions.

== Schedule ==
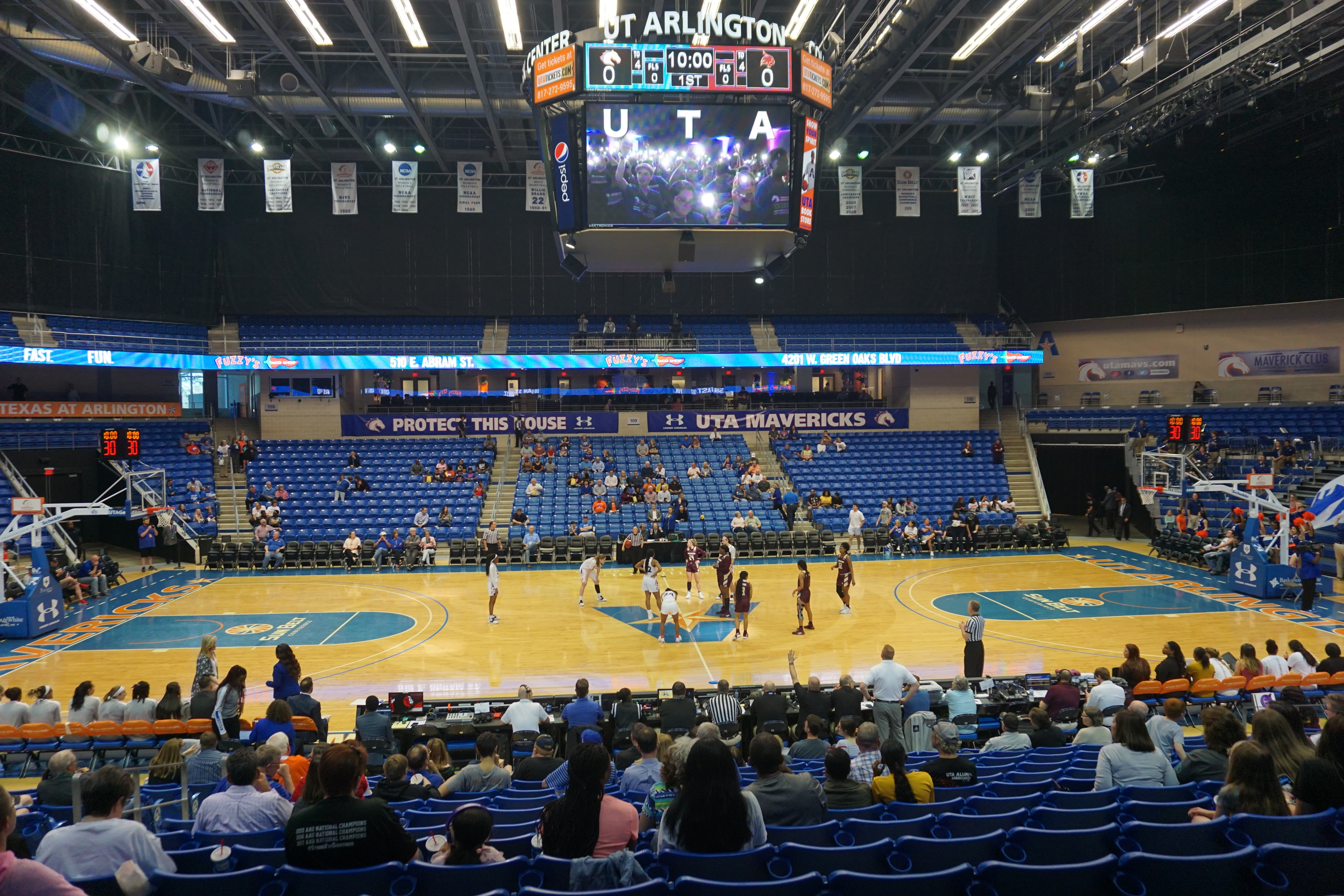
Texas State vs. UT Arlington, first round

Game	Time	Matchup	Score	Television
First round – Tuesday, March 10
1	3:00 pm	No. 5 Little Rock vs. No. 8 Appalachian State	48–47	ESPN+
2	7:00 pm	No. 9 Georgia Southern at No. 4 Louisiana	64–81	ESPN+
3	6:00 pm	No. 10 Texas State at No. 3 UT Arlington	50–74	ESPN+
4	8:30 pm	No. 6 South Alabama vs. No. 7 Arkansas State	82–71	ESPN+
Quarterfinals – Wednesday, March 11
5	7:00 pm	#5 Little Rock vs. #4 Louisiana	46–49	ESPN+
6	7:00 pm	#3 UT Arlington vs. No. 6 South Alabama	47–55	ESPN+
Semifinals – Saturday, March 14
7	5:00 pm	#4 Louisiana vs. No. 1 Troy	cancelled	ESPN+
8	7:30 pm	#6 South Alabama vs. No. 2 Coastal Carolina	cancelled	ESPN+
Championship – Sunday, March 15
9	6:00 pm	Game 7 winner vs. Game 8 winner	cancelled	ESPN3
Game times are in Central Time. Rankings denote tournament seed.

== See also ==
2020 Sun Belt Conference men's basketball tournament
