= 2019–20 Little Rock Trojans women's basketball team =

Intercollegiate basketball season

2019–20 Little Rock Trojans women's basketball
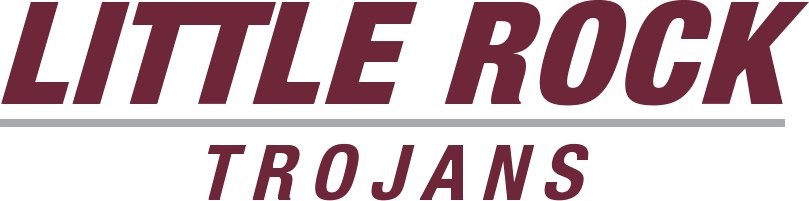
- Conference: Sun Belt Conference
- Record: 12–19 (9–9 Sun Belt)
- Head coach: Joe Foley (17th season)
- Assistant coaches: Bobby Brasel; Alicia Cash; Steve Wiedower
- Home arena: Jack Stephens Center

2019–20 Sun Belt Conference women's basketball standings
	Conf.				Overall
Team	W		L	PCT	W		L	PCT
Troy*	16	–	2	.889	25	–	4	.862
Coastal Carolina	15	–	3	.833	25	–	4	.862
UT Arlington	14	–	4	.778	21	–	11	.656
Louisiana	10	–	8	.556	19	–	12	.613
South Alabama	9	–	9	.500	16	–	16	.500
Little Rock	9	–	9	.500	12	–	19	.387
Arkansas State	8	–	10	.444	12	–	18	.400
Appalachian State	8	–	10	.444	11	–	19	.367
Georgia Southern	7	–	11	.389	10	–	19	.345
Texas State	6	–	12	.333	13	–	17	.433
Georgia State	5	–	13	.278	8	–	21	.276
Louisiana–Monroe	1	–	17	.056	3	–	26	.103
† 2020 Sun Belt tournament winner

The 2019–20 Little Rock Trojans women's basketball team represented the University of Arkansas at Little Rock during the 2019–20 NCAA Division I women's basketball season. The Trojans, led by seventeenth year head coach Joe Foley, play their home games at the Jack Stephens Center and were members of the Sun Belt Conference. They finished the season 12–19, 9–9 in Sun Belt play to finish in a tie for fifth place with South Alabama. In the Sun Belt tournament, the Trojans, placed fifth, defeated No. 8 Appalachian State 48-47 before being defeated by No. 4 Louisiana 46–49. Shortly after being eliminated, the conference canceled the remainder of the tournament due to the COVID-19 pandemic which was followed with the NCAA canceling all post-season play.

== Preseason ==
=== Sun Belt coaches poll ===
On October 30, 2019, the Sun Belt released their preseason coaches poll with the Trojans predicted to finish as champions of the conference.

Predicted finish	Team	Votes (1st place)
1	Little Rock	127 (6)
2	Troy	123 (4)
3	UT Arlington	120 (1)
4	South Alabama	119 (1)
5	Appalachian State	100
6	Georgia State	73
7	Coastal Carolina	66
8	Louisiana	64
9	Texas State	59
10	Arkansas State	44
11	Georgia Southern	26
12	Louisiana–Monroe	15

=== Sun Belt Preseason All-Conference team ===
1st team

- Kyra Collier – SR, Guard

2nd team

- Tori Lasker – JR, Guard

== Roster ==
2019–20 Little Rock Trojans women's basketball team
Players
Coaches

Pos.	#	Name	Height	Year	Previous school	Hometown
G	1	Skyla Knight	5 ft 7 in (1.7 m)	Fr	Hoover HS	Hoover, AL
G	2	Ky'Lie Scott	5 ft 9 in (1.75 m)	Fr	Denton HS	Denton, TX
F	4	Kiana Anderson	6 ft 1 in (1.85 m)	Fr	Warren Easton HS	New Orleans, LA
G	5	Tori Lasker	5 ft 7 in (1.7 m)	Jr	Mayflower HS	Mayflower, AR
F	10	Krystan Vornes	6 ft 2 in (1.88 m)	Jr	Osceola HS; Tulsa	Osceola, AR
G	12	Sydney Chastain	5 ft 7 in (1.7 m)	Sr	Westmoore HS	Oklahoma City, OK
G	23	Kyra Collier	5 ft 9 in (1.75 m)	Sr	North Little Rock HS	North Little Rock, AR
F	25	Alayzha Knapp	6 ft 2 in (1.88 m)	Fr	Union HS	Tulsa, OK
F	31	Brianna Crane	6 ft 0 in (1.83 m)	Jr	Ramsay HS; Murray State	Birmingham, AL
F	32	Nicole Hemphill	6 ft 0 in (1.83 m)	Fr	O'Connor HS	San Antonio, TX
F	34	Angelique Francis	5 ft 11 in (1.8 m)	Fr	MacArthur HS	Irving, TX
F	35	Teal Battle	6 ft 1 in (1.85 m)	Jr	White Station HS	Millington, TN

Head coach

- Joe Foley (Central Arkansas)

Assistant coach(es)

- Bobby Brasel (UT Permian Basin)
- Alicia Cash (Little Rock)
- Steve Wiedower (Arkansas State)

Legend

- (C) Team captain
- (S) Suspended
- (I) Ineligible
- (W) Walk-on
- Injured
- Current redshirt

Roster
Last update: 1 August 2020

== Schedule ==
Date time, TV	Rank^{#}	Opponent^{#}	Result	Record	High points	High rebounds	High assists	Site (attendance) city, state
Non-conference regular season
Nov 5, 2019*; 7:00 pm, SECN+		at No. 6 Texas A&M	L 35–78	0–1	13 – Collier	7 – Vornes	4 – Lasker	Reed Arena (2,758); College Station, TX
Nov 9, 2019*; 1:00 pm, ESPN3		at Rice	L 40–66	0–2	16 – Collier	7 – Battle	4 – Lasker	Tudor Fieldhouse (1,939); Houston, TX
Nov 13, 2019*; 6:30 pm, CST		LSU; Eat Local. Ball Local	L 50–65	0–3	16 – Collier	6 – Collier	3 – Chastain	Jack Stephens Center (1,030); Little Rock, AR
Nov 16, 2019*; 2:00 pm		Central Arkansas; Governor's I-40 Showdown	W 63–48	1–3	18 – Collier	10 – Collier	7 – Collier	Jack Stephens Center (807); Little Rock, AR
Nov 21, 2019*; 6:00 pm		at Florida Atlantic	L 72–79	1–4	17 – Battle	7 – Vornes	5 – Collier	FAU Arena (467); Boca Raton, FL
Nov 24, 2019*; 2:00 pm, ESPN3		at Western Kentucky	L 58–77	1–5	22 – Collier	8 – Vornes	5 – Lasker	E. A. Diddle Arena (1,007); Bowling Green, KY
Dec 2, 2019*; 6:30 pm, ESPN+		Louisiana Tech	L 38–43	1–6	17 – Collier	12 – Chastain	4 – Chastain	Jack Stephens Center (821); Little Rock, AR
Dec 7, 2019*; 2:00 pm		Tulsa	W 63–51	2–6	19 – Collier	8 – Collier	9 – Chastain	Jack Stephens Center (838); Little Rock, AR
Dec 17, 2019*; 6:30 pm		Memphis	L 50–68	2–7	17 – Collier	6 – Vornes	5 – Chastain	Jack Stephens Center (753); Little Rock, AR
Dec 21, 2019*; 1:00 pm		vs. No. 20 Arkansas	L 53–86	2–8	15 – Francis	6 – Francis	4 – Chastain	Simmons Bank Arena (5,540); North Little Rock, AR
Dec 29, 2019*; 2:00 pm, SECN+		at No. 15 Mississippi State	L 50–89	2–9	16 – Collier	7 – Anderson	6 – Chastain	Humphrey Coliseum (7,895); Starkville, MS
Sun Belt Conference regular season
Jan 2, 2020; 7:00 pm, ESPN+		at Texas State	W 78–66	3–9 (1–0)	20 – Knapp	8 – Vornes	8 – Chastain	Strahan Coliseum (895); San Marcos, TX
Jan 4, 2020; 2:00 pm, ESPN+		at UT Arlington	L 58–65	3–10 (1–1)	16 – Collier	8 – Vornes	4 – Lasker	College Park Center (1,079); Arlington, TX
Jan 9, 2020; 6:30 pm, ESPN+		Georgia Southern	W 58–46	4–10 (2–1)	16 – Collier	15 – Battle	7 – Lasker	Jack Stephens Center (516); Little Rock, AR
Jan 11, 2020; 2:00 pm, ESPN+		Georgia State	W 66–46	5–10 (3–1)	23 – Collier	9 – Vornes	6 – Lasker	Jack Stephens Center; Little Rock, AR
Jan 15, 2020; 6:30 pm, ESPN+		Coastal Carolina	L 48–68	5–11 (3–2)	17 – Battle	8 – Vornes	4 – Lasker	Jack Stephens Center (593); Little Rock, AR
Jan 18, 2020; 2:00 pm, ESPN+		Arkansas State; 20th Anniversary Recognition Night	W 67–58	6–11 (4–2)	26 – Collier	7 – Collier	6 – Chastain	Jack Stephens Center (1,034); Little Rock, AR
Jan 23, 2020; 6:00 pm		at Louisiana–Monroe	W 70–50	7–11 (5–2)	18 – Battle	11 – Battle	6 – Collier	Fant–Ewing Coliseum (744); Monroe, LA
Jan 25, 2020; 2:00 pm, ESPN+		Appalachian State	W 68–63	8–11 (6–2)	25 – Battle	10 – Collier	5 – Lasker	Jack Stephens Center (1,009); Little Rock, AR
Feb 1, 2020; 2:00 pm, CST/ESPN+		at Louisiana	W 59–44	9–11 (7–2)	21 – Knapp	9 – Battle	5 – Lasker	Cajundome (868); Lafayette, LA
Feb 6, 2020; 5:30 pm, ESPN+		at Georgia Southern	W 65–49	10–11 (8–2)	17 – Collier	8 – Hemphill	6 – Collier	Hanner Fieldhouse (231); Statesboro, GA
Feb 8, 2020; 1:00 pm, ESPN+		at Georgia State	L 43–58	10–12 (8–3)	13 – Chastain	6 – Chastain	4 – Lasker	GSU Sports Arena (530); Atlanta, GA
Feb 13, 2020; 11:30 am, ESPN+		Texas State; School Day	L 47–50	10–13 (8–4)	15 – Battle	11 – Knapp	5 – Battle	Jack Stephens Center (2,557); Little Rock, AR
Feb 15, 2020; 2:00 pm, ESPN+		UT Arlington; Pink Game	L 46–62	10–14 (8–5)	11 – Collier	9 – Hemphill	5 – Collier	Jack Stephens Center (925); Little Rock, AR
Feb 20, 2020; 6:00 pm, ESPN+		at Troy	L 59–77	10–15 (8–6)	24 – Battle	13 – Collier	4 – Lasker	Trojan Arena (2,001); Troy, AL
Feb 22, 2020; 3:00 pm, ESPN+		at South Alabama	W 69–58	11–15 (9–6)	16 – Lasker	7 – Battle	5 – Collier	Mitchell Center (279); Mobile, AL
Feb 28, 2020; 7:00 pm, ESPN+		at Arkansas State	L 54–72	11–16 (9–7)	16 – Collier	8 – Francis	6 – Chastain	First National Bank Arena (819); Jonesboro, AR
Mar 5, 2020; 6:30 pm, ESPN+		Troy	L 54–70	11–17 (9–8)	15 – Battle	8 – Knapp	6 – Collier	Jack Stephens Center (662); Little Rock, AR
Mar 7, 2020; 2:00 pm, ESPN+		South Alabama; Senior Day	L 42–57	11–18 (9–9)	16 – Collier	7 – TEAM	2 – Lasker	Jack Stephens Center (843); Little Rock, AR
Sun Belt Women's Tournament
Mar 10, 2020; 3:00 pm, ESPN+	(5)	vs. (8) Appalachian State; First Round	W 48–47	12–18	14 – Collier	9 – Battle	3 – Chastain	Cajundome (169); Lafayette, LA
Mar 11, 2020; 7:00 am, ESPN+	(5)	at (4) Louisiana; Quarterfinals	L 46–49	12–19	14 – Collier	6 – Vornes	4 – Lasker	Cajundome; New Orleans, LA
*Non-conference game. ^{#}Rankings from AP Poll. (#) Tournament seedings in parentheses. All times are in Central Time.

== See also ==
- 2019–20 Little Rock Trojans men's basketball team
