= 2019–20 Georgia Southern Eagles women's basketball team =

Intercollegiate basketball season

2019–20 Georgia Southern Eagles women's basketball
- Conference: Sun Belt Conference
- Record: 10–20 (7–11 Sun Belt)
- Head coach: Anita Howard (1st season)
- Assistant coaches: Deont'A McChester; Coretta Brown; Chris Straker
- Home arena: Hanner Fieldhouse

2019–20 Sun Belt Conference women's basketball standings
	Conf.				Overall
Team	W		L	PCT	W		L	PCT
Troy*	16	–	2	.889	25	–	4	.862
Coastal Carolina	15	–	3	.833	25	–	4	.862
UT Arlington	14	–	4	.778	21	–	11	.656
Louisiana	10	–	8	.556	19	–	12	.613
South Alabama	9	–	9	.500	16	–	16	.500
Little Rock	9	–	9	.500	12	–	19	.387
Arkansas State	8	–	10	.444	12	–	18	.400
Appalachian State	8	–	10	.444	11	–	19	.367
Georgia Southern	7	–	11	.389	10	–	19	.345
Texas State	6	–	12	.333	13	–	17	.433
Georgia State	5	–	13	.278	8	–	21	.276
Louisiana–Monroe	1	–	17	.056	3	–	26	.103
† 2020 Sun Belt tournament winner

The 2019–20 Georgia Southern Eagles women's basketball team represented Georgia Southern University in the 2019–20 NCAA Division I women's basketball season. The Eagles, led by first year head coach Anita Howard, played their home games at Hanner Fieldhouse and were members of the Sun Belt Conference. They finished the season 10–20, 7–11 in Sun Belt play to finish in ninth place. The qualified for the Sun Belt tournament, seeded ninth, were defeated by No. 4 Louisiana by the score of 64–81. Shortly after being eliminated, the Sun Belt canceled the remainder of the tournament which was followed by the NCAA cancelling all remaining post-season play.

== Preseason ==
=== Sun Belt coaches poll ===
On October 30, 2019, the Sun Belt released their preseason coaches poll with the Eagles predicted to finish in eleventh place in the conference.

Predicted finish	Team	Votes (1st place)
1	Little Rock	127 (6)
2	Troy	123 (4)
3	UT Arlington	120 (1)
4	South Alabama	119 (1)
5	Appalachian State	100
6	Georgia State	73
7	Coastal Carolina	66
8	Louisiana	64
9	Texas State	59
10	Arkansas State	44
11	Georgia Southern	26
12	Louisiana–Monroe	15

=== Sun Belt Preseason All-Conference team ===
2nd team
- Alexis Brown – SR, Guard

== Roster ==
2019–20 Georgia Southern Eagles women's basketball team
Players
Coaches

Pos.	#	Name	Height	Year	Previous school	Hometown
G	1	Jordan Strange	5 ft 7 in (1.7 m)	So	AC Flora HS	Columbia, SC
G	4	Alexis Brown	5 ft 6 in (1.68 m)	Sr	Morgan County HS	Madison, GA
F	5	Tsubasa Nisbet	6 ft 0 in (1.83 m)	So	Burnside HS	Christchurch, New Zealand
G	10	Mya Burns	6 ft 0 in (1.83 m)	Fr	North Augusta HS	North Augusta, SC
G	12	Jaiden Hamilton	5 ft 9 in (1.75 m)	Fr	Laney HS	Augusta, GA
G/F	13	Nakol Franks	5 ft 7 in (1.7 m)	Sr	Wren HS	Greenville, SC
G	14	Lola Loviett	5 ft 10 in (1.78 m)	RS Fr	John T. Hoggard HS	Wilmington, NC
G	15	Amira Atwater	5 ft 6 in (1.68 m)	Sr	Douglas County HS	Douglasville, GA
G	22	Ja'Nya Love–Hill	5 ft 6 in (1.68 m)	Fr	Carver HS	Columbus, GA
G	23	Tatum Barber	5 ft 10 in (1.78 m)	Jr	Liberty Christian School	Dallas, TX
G	25	Nikki McDonald	6 ft 0 in (1.83 m)	Sr	Wesleyan HS; Louisiana Tech	Atlanta, GA
F	32	Hailey Dias-Allen	6 ft 2 in (1.88 m)	Sr	Southeast Guilford HS	Greensboro, NC
F	33	Victoria Stavropoulos	6 ft 0 in (1.83 m)	Sr	Carl Sandburg HS	Orland Park, IL
F/C	42	Sarah Moore	6 ft 1 in (1.85 m)	Jr	Middleton HS	Spring Hill, FL
F	44	La'Tia Fils–Aime'	6 ft 1 in (1.85 m)	RS Jr	Daleville HS; Troy	Daleville, AL

Head coach

- Anita Howard (Armstrong State)

Assistant coach(es)

- Josh Cooperwood (Tennessee State)
- Coretta Brown (North Carolina)
- Chris Straker (San Diego State)

Legend

- (C) Team captain
- (S) Suspended
- (I) Ineligible
- (W) Walk-on
- Injured
- Current redshirt

Roster
Last update: 5 August 2020

== Schedule ==
Date time, TV	Rank^{#}	Opponent^{#}	Result	Record	High points	High rebounds	High assists	Site (attendance) city, state
Exhibition
Oct 30, 2019*; 6:30 pm		Coker	W 93–66		21 – Barber	7 – Hamilton	7 – Atwater	Hanner Fieldhouse (250); Statesboro, GA
Nov 5, 2019*; 6:30 pm, ESPN+		Coastal Georgia	W 106–69		15 – Franks	12 – Barber	5 – Atwater	Hanner Fieldhouse (269); Statesboro, GA
Non-conference regular season
Nov 10, 2019*; 6:00 pm, ESPN+		at Furman	L 63–78	0–1	14 – Barber	6 – McDonald	4 – Burns	Timmons Arena (452); Greenville, SC
Nov 17, 2019*; 2:00 pm, ESPN+		Kennesaw State	L 69–95	0–2	18 – Barber	8 – Barber	3 – Atwater	Hanner Fieldhouse (437); Statesboro, GA
Nov 20, 2019*; 11:00 am, ESPN+		North Dakota	L 56–69	0–3	11 – Barber	8 – TEAM	3 – Atwater	Hanner Fieldhouse (2,912); Statesboro, GA
Nov 23, 2019*; 3:00 pm		at Bethune–Cookman	L 57–75	0–4	15 – Brown	7 – TEAM	2 – Hamilton	Moore Gymnasium (225); Daytona Beach, FL
Nov 26, 2019*; 7:00 pm, ESPN+		at Winthrop	W 91–49	1–4	20 – Brown	13 – McDonald	4 – Atwater	Winthrop Coliseum (211); Rock Hill, SC
Dec 1, 2019*; 2:00 pm		at Wofford	W 70–57	2–4	19 – Brown	10 – Brown	3 – Atwater	Jerry Richardson Indoor Stadium (723); Spartanburg, SC
Dec 7, 2019*; 2:00 pm, ESPN+		at Mercer	L 52–62	2–5	14 – McDonald	11 – McDonald	3 – Atwater	Hawkins Arena (1,261); Macon, GA
Dec 16, 2019*; 12:00 pm, SECN+		at Ole Miss	L 66–69 ^{OT}	2–6	26 – McDonald	13 – TEAM	10 – Atwater	The Pavilion at Ole Miss (6,574); Oxford, MS
Dec 19, 2019*; 3:00 pm		vs. Kent State; Las Vegas Holiday Hoops Classic	L 48–62	2–7	12 – Brown	7 – Barber	3 – Franks	South Point Arena (120); Las Vegas, NV
Dec 20, 2019*; 5:30 pm		vs. St. Francis Brooklyn; Las Vegas Holiday Hoops Classic	W 78–47	3–7	11 – Burns	8 – Dias–Allen	2 – Strange	South Point Arena (120); Las Vegas, NV
Dec 20, 2019*; 8:00 pm		vs. Tulane	L 40–56	3–8	15 – Barber	8 – Burns	2 – Brown	Devlin Fieldhouse (473); New Orleans, LA
Sun Belt regular season
Jan 2, 2020; 6:30 pm, ESPN+		Louisiana–Monroe	W 64–47	4–8 (1–0)	16 – Hamilton	6 – Moore	5 – Brown	Hanner Fieldhouse (323); Statesboro, GA
Jan 4, 2020; 2:00 pm, ESPN+		Louisiana	W 83–67	5–8 (2–0)	16 – Brown	7 – McDonald	5 – Atwater	Hanner Fieldhouse (447); Statesboro, GA
Jan 9, 2020; 7:30 pm, ESPN+		at Little Rock	L 46–58	5–9 (2–1)	6 – Dias–Allen	10 – McDonald	2 – Barber	Jack Stephens Center (516); Little Rock, AR
Jan 11, 2020; 2:00 pm, ESPN+		at Arkansas State	L 62–69	5–10 (2–2)	20 – Barber	11 – Nisbet	3 – Brown	First National Bank Arena (718); Jonesboro, AR
Jan 16, 2020; 6:30 pm, ESPN+		Troy	L 69–79	5–11 (2–3)	23 – Brown	10 – Barber	3 – Brown	Hanner Fieldhouse (411); Statesboro, GA
Jan 18, 2020; 2:00 pm, ESPN+		South Alabama	L 65–71	5–12 (2–4)	14 – Hamilton	7 – TEAM	2 – Franks	Hanner Fieldhouse (387); Statesboro, GA
Jan 25, 2020; 2:00 pm, ESPN+		Georgia State; Modern Day Hate	W 81–56	6–12 (3–4)	21 – Barber	9 – Burns	4 – Nisbet	Hanner Fieldhouse (1,619); Statesboro, GA
Jan 30, 2029; 6:00 pm, ESPN+		at Coastal Carolina	L 59–66	6–13 (3–5)	15 – Brown	5 – TEAM	2 – Burns	HTC Center (195); Conway, SC
Feb 1, 2020; 2:00 pm, ESPN+		at Appalachian State	L 75–83	6–14 (3–6)	19 – Barber	8 – Barber	5 – Brown	Holmes Center (576); Boone, NC
Feb 6, 2020; 6:30 pm, ESPN+		Little Rock	L 49–65	6–15 (3–7)	12 – Barber	7 – Hamilton	3 – Nisbet	Hanner Fieldhouse (231); Statesboro, GA
Feb 8, 2020; 2:00 pm, ESPN+		Arkansas State	W 80–67	7–15 (4–7)	25 – Hamilton	11 – Brown	4 – Brown	Hanner Fieldhouse (530); Statesboro, GA
Feb 13, 2020; 7:00 pm, ESPN+		at Louisiana–Monroe	W 72–66	8–15 (5–7)	17 – Hamilton	10 – Brown	4 – Atwater	Fant–Ewing Coliseum (723); Monroe, LA
Feb 15, 2020; 3:00 pm		at Louisiana	L 60–72	8–16 (5–8)	15 – Barber	7 – Moore	3 – Brown	Cajundome (801); Lafayette, LA
Feb 20, 2020; 6:30 pm, ESPN+		Coastal Carolina	L 74–90	8–17 (5–9)	31 – Barber	7 – McDonald	4 – Brown	Hanner Fieldhouse (371); Statesboro, GA
Feb 22, 2020; 2:00 pm, ESPN+		Appalachian State	W 78–70	9–17 (6–9)	18 – Barber	9 – Brown	8 – Atwater	Hanner Fieldhouse (513); Statesboro, GA
Feb 27, 2020; 12:30 pm, ESPN+		at Texas State	L 68–72	9–18 (6–10)	20 – McDonald	16 – McDonald	5 – Brown	Strahan Coliseum (3,385); San Marcos, TX
Feb 29, 2020; 3:00 pm, ESPN+		at UT Arlington	L 73–101	9–19 (6–11)	23 – Brown	10 – McDonald	4 – Barber	College Park Center (1,108); Arlington, TX
Mar 7, 2020; 2:00 pm, ESPN+		at Georgia State; Modern Day Hate	W 77–74	10–19 (7–11)	16 – Barber	12 – McDonald	4 – Atwater	GSU Sports Arena (675); Atlanta, GA
Sun Belt Women's Tournament
Mar 10, 2020; 8:00 pm, ESPN+	(9)	at (4) Louisiana; First Round	L 64–81	10–20	14 – Dias–Allen	7 – Barber	3 – Brown	Cajundome (300); Lafayette, LA
*Non-conference game. ^{#}Rankings from AP Poll. (#) Tournament seedings in parentheses. All times are in Eastern Time.

== See also ==
- 2019–20 Georgia Southern Eagles men's basketball team
