= 2019–20 South Alabama Jaguars women's basketball team =

American college basketball season

2019–20 South Alabama Jaguars women's basketball
- Conference: Sun Belt Conference
- Record: 16–16 (9–9 Sun Belt)
- Head coach: Terry Fowler (7th season)
- Assistant coaches: Yolisha Jackson; Dan Presel; Rachel Travis
- Home arena: Mitchell Center

2019–20 Sun Belt Conference women's basketball standings
	Conf.				Overall
Team	W		L	PCT	W		L	PCT
Troy*	16	–	2	.889	25	–	4	.862
Coastal Carolina	15	–	3	.833	25	–	4	.862
UT Arlington	14	–	4	.778	21	–	11	.656
Louisiana	10	–	8	.556	19	–	12	.613
South Alabama	9	–	9	.500	16	–	16	.500
Little Rock	9	–	9	.500	12	–	19	.387
Arkansas State	8	–	10	.444	12	–	18	.400
Appalachian State	8	–	10	.444	11	–	19	.367
Georgia Southern	7	–	11	.389	10	–	19	.345
Texas State	6	–	12	.333	13	–	17	.433
Georgia State	5	–	13	.278	8	–	21	.276
Louisiana–Monroe	1	–	17	.056	3	–	26	.103
† 2020 Sun Belt tournament winner

The 2019–20 South Alabama Jaguars women's basketball team represented the University of South Alabama during the 2019–20 NCAA Division I women's basketball season. The Jaguars were led by seventh year head coach Terry Fowler and played their home games at the Mitchell Center as members in the Sun Belt Conference. They finished the season 16–16, 9–9 in Sun Belt play to finish in tie for fifth place. They made it to the Sun Belt tournament as the sixth seed (Little Rock broke the tie winning both regular season games against the Jaguars) where they defeated Arkansas State 82–71 in the First Round and also defeated UT Arlington 47–55 in the Quarterfinals. Shortly before playing Coastal Carolina in the semifinals, the Sun Belt canceled the remainder tournament in the wake of the COVID-19 pandemic, which was followed by the NCAA cancelling all post-season play.

== Preseason ==
=== Sun Belt coaches poll ===
On October 30, 2019, the Sun Belt released their preseason coaches poll with the Jaguars predicted to finish in fourth place in the conference.

Predicted finish	Team	Votes (1st place)
1	Little Rock	127 (6)
2	Troy	123 (4)
3	UT Arlington	120 (1)
4	South Alabama	119 (1)
5	Appalachian State	100
6	Georgia State	73
7	Coastal Carolina	66
8	Louisiana	64
9	Texas State	59
10	Arkansas State	44
11	Georgia Southern	26
12	Louisiana–Monroe	15

=== Sun Belt Preseason All-Conference team ===
1st team

- Savannah Jones – R-JR, Guard
- Antoinette Lewis – JR, Forward

3rd team

- Shaforia Kines – SR, Guard

=== Preseason Sun Belt Player of the Year ===
- Antoinette Lewis – Junior, Forward

== Roster ==
2019–20 South Alabama Jaguars women's basketball team
Players
Coaches

Pos.	#	Name	Height	Year	Previous school	Hometown
G	2	Shaforia Kines	5 ft 5 in (1.65 m)	Sr	Huffman HS	Birmingham, AL
G	3	Jayla Morrow	5 ft 8 in (1.73 m)	Jr	Wenonah HS	Birmingham, AL
G	4	Mahogany Vaught	5 ft 6 in (1.68 m)	So	Olive Branch HS	Olive Branch, MS
G	5	Emerald Hart	5 ft 9 in (1.75 m)	Sr	Pal Beach Gardens HS; NW Kansas Tech	Riviera Beach, FL
G	12	Damaya Telemaque	5 ft 8 in (1.73 m)	So	Summer Creek HS	Houston, TX
G	14	Savannah Jones	6 ft 0 in (1.83 m)	RS Jr	St. Martin HS	Ocean Springs, MS
G/F	21	Casey Ferguson	5 ft 11 in (1.8 m)	RS So	D'Iberville HS	Biloxi, MS
F/C	22	Jaylen Mallard	6 ft 2 in (1.88 m)	Fr	EStem Public Charter	Little Rock, AR
G/F	23	Jala Buster	5 ft 10 in (1.78 m)	So	Cypress Ranch HS	Houston, TX
F	25	Kennedi Centers	6 ft 0 in (1.83 m)	Sr	Samuel Clemens HS	New Braunfels, TX
C	34	Ashanti Lavergne	6 ft 2 in (1.88 m)	Fr	Scotlandville Magnet HS	Baton Rouge, LA
C	35	Antoinette Lewis	6 ft 1 in (1.85 m)	Jr	Harding Academy	Memphis, TN
G	45	Devyn Lowe	5 ft 7 in (1.7 m)	RS So	Woodstock HS	Woodstock, GA
F/C		Jadona Davis	6 ft 5 in (1.96 m)	Jr	Wayne County HS; Middle Tennessee	Buckatunna, MS

Head coach

- Terry Fowler (Lane College)

Assistant coach(es)

- Yolisha Jackson (Jacksonville)
- Dan Presel (Spring Hill)
- Rachel Travis (Northwest)

Legend

- (C) Team captain
- (S) Suspended
- (I) Ineligible
- (W) Walk-on
- Injured
- Current redshirt

Roster
Last update: 31 July 2020

== Schedule ==
Date time, TV	Rank^{#}	Opponent^{#}	Result	Record	High points	High rebounds	High assists	Site (attendance) city, state
Exhibition
Oct 28, 2019*; 7:00 pm, ESPN+		Birmingham–Southern	W 104–51		22 – Lewis	9 – Centers	6 – Kines	Mitchell Center (497); Mobile, AL
Non-conference regular season
Nov 5, 2019*; 7:00 pm, ESPN+		Rutgers	L 56–77	0–1	15 – Telemaque	16 – Lewis	2 – Jones	Mitchell Center (773); Mobile, AL
Nov 8, 2019*; 4:00 pm		at UAB; Preseason NIT	L 61–77	0–2	14 – Kines	12 – Lewis	3 – Kines	Bartow Arena (415); Birmingham, AL
Nov 14, 2019*; 7:00 pm		Texas A&M–Corpus Christi; Preseason NIT	W 83–82 ^{2OT}	1–2	24 – Lewis	18 – Lewis	5 – Kines	Mitchell Center (318); Mobile, AL
Nov 15, 2019*; 7:00 pm		Miami (OH); Preseason NIT	L 73–76	1–3	26 – Lewis	10 – Lewis	3 – Kines	Mitchell Center (335); Mobile, AL
Nov 21, 2019*; 7:00 pm, ESPN+		Alabama	L 62–74	1–4	29 – Kines	9 – Lewis	4 – Kines	Mitchell Center (1,270); Mobile, AL
Nov 26, 2019*; 7:00 pm, ESPN+		Mobile	W 103–59	2–4	36 – Lewis	9 – Lewis	12 – Lowe	Mitchell Center (371); Mobile, AL
Nov 30, 2019*; 1:00 pm		Tennessee State	W 70–48	3–4	21 – Kines	10 – Lewis	5 – Kines	Mitchell Center (236); Mobile, AL
Dec 4, 2019*; 7:00 pm, ESPN+		Auburn	L 62–82	3–5	18 – Kines	11 – Lewis	4 – Buster	Mitchell Center (1,106); Mobile, AL
Dec 7, 2019*; 4:00 pm		at Tulane	W 62–53	4–5	23 – Kines	16 – Lewis	3 – Kines	Devlin Fieldhouse (527); New Orleans, LA
Dec 15, 2019*; 2:00 pm		at Southern Miss	L 55–62	4–6	15 – Kines	10 – Lewis	3 – Morrow	Reed Green Coliseum (1,243); Hattiesburg, MS
Dec 17, 2019*; 5:00 pm, ESPN+		William Carey	W 68–52	5–6	13 – Telemaque	10 – Lewis	3 – Kines	Mitchell Center (1,545); Mobile, AL
Dec 20, 2019*; 5:00 pm, ESPN3		at East Tennessee State	L 60–65	5–7	25 – Jones	8 – Mallard	2 – Kines	J. Madison Brooks Gymnasium (704); Johnson City, TN
Sun Belt regular season
Jan 2, 2020; 7:00 pm, ESPN+		Appalachian State	W 81–66	6–7 (1–0)	24 – Kines	11 – Kines	5 – Kines	Mitchell Center (308); Mobile, AL
Jan 4, 2020; 2:00 pm, ESPN+		Coastal Carolina	L 62–71	6–8 (1–1)	21 – Kines	11 – Lewis	3 – Telemaque	Mitchell Center (314); Mobile, AL
Jan 9, 2020; 6:00 pm, ESPN+		at Louisiana	L 68–73	6–9 (1–2)	23 – Lewis	15 – Kines	4 – Telemaque	Cajundome (824); Lafayette, LA
Jan 11, 2020; 4:00 pm, ESPN+		Louisiana–Monroe	W 72–63	7–9 (2–2)	17 – Kines	9 – Centers	2 – Telemaque	Mitchell Center (330); Mobile, AL
Jan 16, 2020; 5:00 pm, ESPN+		at Georgia State	W 81–64	8–9 (3–2)	17 – Jones	6 – Jones	4 – Kines	GSU Sports Arena (426); Atlanta, GA
Jan 18, 2020; 1:00 pm, ESPN+		at Georgia Southern	W 71–65	9–9 (4–2)	25 – Lewis	10 – Lewis	6 – Kines	Hanner Fieldhouse (387); Statesboro, GA
Jan 23, 2020; 7:00 pm, ESPN+		UT Arlington	L 45–68	9–10 (4–3)	12 – Jones	12 – Lewis	2 – Lewis	Mitchell Center (395); Mobile, AL
Jan 25, 2020; 5:00 pm, ESPN+		Texas State	W 78–76 ^{2OT}	10–10 (5–3)	24 – Jones	10 – Lewis	4 – Morrow	Mitchell Center (1,934); Mobile, AL
Feb 1, 2020; 2:00 pm, ESPN+		at Troy	L 68–85	10–11 (5–4)	22 – Kines	14 – Lewis	4 – Jones	Trojan Arena (1,783); Troy, AL
Feb 6, 2020; 6:00 pm, ESPN+		Louisiana	W 78–63	11–11 (6–4)	26 – Jones	10 – Mallard	5 – Telemaque	Mitchell Center (345); Mobile, AL
Feb 8, 2020; 12:00 pm, ESPN+		at Louisiana–Monroe	W 73–39	12–11 (7–4)	18 – Lewis	11 – Lewis	6 – Telemaque	Fant–Ewing Coliseum (626); Monroe, LA
Feb 13, 2020; 11:00 am, ESPN+		Appalachian State	L 59–71	12–12 (7–5)	19 – Kines	10 – Lewis	3 – Kines	Holmes Convocation Center (1,224); Boone, NC
Feb 15, 2020; 1:00 pm, ESPN+		at Coastal Carolina	L 73–76	12–13 (7–6)	30 – Kines	13 – Lewis	6 – Telemaque	HTC Center (317); Conway, SC
Feb 20, 2020; 11:00 am, ESPN+		Arkansas State	W 87–71	13–13 (8–6)	20 – Telemaque	10 – Lewis	5 – Telemaque	Mitchell Center (2,104); Mobile, AL
Feb 22, 2020; 3:00 pm, ESPN+		Little Rock	L 58–69	13–14 (8–7)	14 – Centers	8 – Centers	5 – Centers	Mitchell Center (279); Mobile, AL
Feb 29, 2020; 4:00 pm, ESPN+		Troy	L 73–77	13–15 (8–8)	24 – Kines	13 – Centers	4 – Kines	Mitchell Center (4,219); Mobile, AL
Mar 5, 2020; 7:00 pm, ESPN+		at Arkansas State	L 80–86	13–16 (8–9)	21 – Jones	10 – Lewis	4 – Jones	First National Bank Arena (519); Jonesboro, AR
Mar 7, 2020; 2:00 pm, ESPN+		at Little Rock	W 57–42	14–16 (9–9)	16 – Lewis	9 – Lewis	3 – Morrow	Jack Stephens Center (843); Little Rock, AR
Sun Belt Women's Tournament
Mar 10, 2020; 8:30 pm, ESPN+	(6)	vs. (10) Texas State; First Round	W 82–71	15–16	22 – Jones	17 – Centers	7 – Kines	College Park Center (1,002); Arlington, TX
Mar 11, 2020; 7:00 pm, ESPN+	(6)	vs. (3) UT Arlington; Quarterfinals	W 55–47	16–16	28 – Kines	11 – Lewis	3 – Kines	College Park Center; Arlington, TX
Mar 14, 2020; 7:30 pm, ESPN+	(6)	vs. (2) Coastal Carolina; Semifinals	Tournament canceled due to the COVID-19 pandemic					Smoothie King Arena; New Orleans, LA
*Non-conference game. ^{#}Rankings from AP Poll. (#) Tournament seedings in parentheses. All times are in Eastern Time.

== See also ==
- 2019–20 South Alabama Jaguars men's basketball team
