= 2019–20 Georgia State Panthers women's basketball team =

Intercollegiate basketball season

2019–20 Georgia State Panthers women's basketball
- Conference: Sun Belt Conference
- Record: 8–21 (5–13 Sun Belt)
- Head coach: Gene Hill (2nd season)
- Assistant coaches: Sherill Baker; A. G. Hall; Tiffany Morton
- Home arena: GSU Sports Arena

2019–20 Sun Belt Conference women's basketball standings
	Conf.				Overall
Team	W		L	PCT	W		L	PCT
Troy*	16	–	2	.889	25	–	4	.862
Coastal Carolina	15	–	3	.833	25	–	4	.862
UT Arlington	14	–	4	.778	21	–	11	.656
Louisiana	10	–	8	.556	19	–	12	.613
South Alabama	9	–	9	.500	16	–	16	.500
Little Rock	9	–	9	.500	12	–	19	.387
Arkansas State	8	–	10	.444	12	–	18	.400
Appalachian State	8	–	10	.444	11	–	19	.367
Georgia Southern	7	–	11	.389	10	–	19	.345
Texas State	6	–	12	.333	13	–	17	.433
Georgia State	5	–	13	.278	8	–	21	.276
Louisiana–Monroe	1	–	17	.056	3	–	26	.103
† 2020 Sun Belt tournament winner

The 2019–20 Georgia State Panthers women's basketball team represented Georgia State University in the 2019–20 NCAA Division I women's basketball season. The Panthers, led by second year head coach Gene Hill, were a member of the Sun Belt Conference and played their home games on campus at the GSU Sports Arena. They finished season 8–21, 5–13 in Sun Belt play to finish in eleventh place. They were not invited to the Sun Belt tournament following the conclusion of the regular season, and, soon after, the NCAA canceled all post-season play due to the COVID-19 pandemic.

== Preseason ==
=== Sun Belt coaches poll ===
On October 30, 2019, the Sun Belt released their preseason coaches poll with the Panthers predicted to finish in sixth place in the conference.

Predicted finish	Team	Votes (1st place)
1	Little Rock	127 (6)
2	Troy	123 (4)
3	UT Arlington	120 (1)
4	South Alabama	119 (1)
5	Appalachian State	100
6	Georgia State	73
7	Coastal Carolina	66
8	Louisiana	64
9	Texas State	59
10	Arkansas State	44
11	Georgia Southern	26
12	Louisiana–Monroe	15

=== Sun Belt Preseason All-Conference team ===
1st team
- Jada Lewis – R-JR, Guard

== Roster ==
2019–20 Georgia State Panthers women's basketball team
Players
Coaches

Pos.	#	Name	Height	Year	Previous school	Hometown
F	0	Allison Johnson	6 ft 0 in (1.83 m)	Sr	Norcross; Kennesaw State	Norcross, GA
G	1	Moriah Taylor	5 ft 4 in (1.63 m)	Fr	Hartselle HS	Hartselle, AL
G	2	Kennedy Powell	5 ft 8 in (1.73 m)	Fr	Roswell HS	Roswell, GA
F	4	Joelle Johnson	5 ft 11 in (1.8 m)	Fr	Male HS	Louisville, KY
G	5	Emma Drash	5 ft 5 in (1.65 m)	Fr	St. Pius X Catholic HS	Atlanta, GA
G	10	Kamryn Dziak	5 ft 8 in (1.73 m)	Fr	Steele HS	Amherst, OH
G/F	11	Taylor Hosendove	6 ft 0 in (1.83 m)	So	Westlake HS	Atlanta, GA
G	12	Tehya Lyons	5 ft 7 in (1.7 m)	RS Fr	Norcross HS	Norcross, GA
G	13	Jada Lewis	5 ft 7 in (1.7 m)	RS Jr	McEachern	Powder Springs, GA
G	14	Ashley Foster	5 ft 8 in (1.73 m)	So	Eagle's Landing HS	McDonough, GA
G	15	Madison Erwin	5 ft 7 in (1.7 m)	Sr	Freedom; Mars Hill	Morganton, NC
G	21	Taniyah Worth	5 ft 9 in (1.75 m)	So	Flowery Branch HS	Flowery Branch, GA
C	30	Shaquanda Miller-McCray	6 ft 3 in (1.91 m)	Sr	Crestwood	Sumter, SC
G	32	Taylor Henderson	5 ft 10 in (1.78 m)	Fr	Center Point HS	Birmingham, AL
F/C	33	Rakeah Williams	6 ft 1 in (1.85 m)	Jr	Westlake	Atlanta, GA
F	35	Hannah Sadler	6 ft 0 in (1.83 m)	So	Parkview HS	Lilburn, GA

Head coach

- Gene Hill (Coker)

Assistant coach(es)

- Sherill Baker (Georgia)
- A. G. Hall (North Carolina Central)
- Tiffany Morton (UW–Whitewater)

Legend

- (C) Team captain
- (S) Suspended
- (I) Ineligible
- (W) Walk-on
- Injured
- Current redshirt

Roster
Last update: 14 August 2020

== Schedule ==
Date time, TV	Rank^{#}	Opponent^{#}	Result	Record	High points	High rebounds	High assists	Site (attendance) city, state
Non–conference regular season
Nov 5, 2019*; 6:00 pm, ESPN+		Toledo	L 48–74	0–1	13 – Henderson	7 – J. Johnson	4 – Henderson	GSU Sports Arena (514); Atlanta, GA
Nov 11, 2019*; 1:00 pm, ESPN+		FIU	L 63–70	0–2	31 – Henderson	20 – Miller–McCray	3 – Henderson	GSU Sports Arena (420); Atlanta, GA
Nov 20, 2019*; 7:00 pm, ACCN+		at Georgia Tech	L 28–69	0–3	6 – Hosendove	12 – Miller–McCray	2 – Hosendove	McCamish Pavilion (871); Atlanta, GA
Nov 26, 2019*; 6:00 pm, ESPN+		Alabama A&M	L 52–67	0–4	14 – Hosendove	9 – Hosendove	2 – Hosendove	GSU Sports Arena (461); Atlanta, GA
Nov 29, 2019*; 3:00 pm		vs. New Mexico State; UTEP Thanksgiving Classic	W 59–51	1–4	17 – Henderson	11 – Hosendove	3 – Taylor	Don Haskins Center (103); El Paso, TX
Nov 30, 2019*; 9:30 pm		at UTEP; UTEP Thanksgiving Classic	L 68–71	1–5	21 – Hosendove	19 – Hosendove	4 – Hosendove	Don Haskins Center (788); El Paso, TX
Dec 5, 2019*; 7:00 pm, ESPN3		at Furman	L 55–62	1–6	20 – Hosendove	18 – Hosendove	2 – Lewis	Timmons Arena (384); Greenville, SC
Dec 7, 2019*; 4:00 pm, ESPN+		at UNC Greensboro	L 49–64	1–7	11 – Hosendove	13 – Hosendove	2 – Henderson	Flemming Gymnasium (205); Greensboro, NC
Dec 18, 2019*; 11:00 am, ESPN+		Maryland	L 41–114	1–8	10 – Miller–McCray	5 – Hosendove	3 – A. Johnson	GSU Sports Arena (1,501); Atlanta, GA
Dec 21, 2019*; 3:30 pm, ESPN+		South Carolina State; GSU Classic	W 77–52	2–8	14 – A. Johnson	8 – TEAM	3 – Lewis	GSU Sports Arena (406); Atlanta, GA
Dec 22, 2019*; 3:00 pm, ESPN+		SIU Edwardsville; GSU Classic	W 74–73	3–8	17 – Lewis	12 – Hosendove	5 – Lewis	GSU Sports Arena (452); Atlanta, GA
Sun Belt regular season
Jan 2, 2020; 2:00 pm, ESPN+		Louisiana	L 65–75	3–9 (0–1)	12 – Lewis	12 – Miller–McCray	2 – Dziak	GSU Sports Arena (408); Atlanta, GA
Jan 4, 2020; 12:00 pm, ESPN+		Louisiana–Monroe	W 68–52	4–9 (1–1)	18 – Lewis	8 – Miller–McCray	4 – Miller–McCray	GSU Sports Arena (465); Atlanta, GA
Jan 9, 2020; 8:00 pm		at Arkansas State	L 68–70 ^{OT}	4–10 (1–2)	22 – Lewis	12 – A. Johnson	3 – A. Johnson	First National Bank Arena (613); Jonesboro, AR
Jan 11, 2020; 3:00 pm		at Little Rock	L 46–66	4–11 (1–3)	14 – Lyons	10 – Miller–McCray	2 – Lyons	Jack Stephens Center; Little Rock, AR
Jan 16, 2020; 6:00 pm, ESPN+		South Alabama	L 64–81	4–12 (1–4)	22 – Hosendove	10 – Hosendove	3 – Hosendove	GSU Sports Arena (426); Atlanta, GA
Jan 18, 2020; 2:00 pm, ESPN+		Troy	L 57–71	4–13 (1–5)	11 – J. Johnson	6 – Hosendove	4 – Henderson	GSU Sports Arena (449); Atlanta, GA
Jan 25, 2020; 2:00 pm		at Georgia Southern; Modern Day Hate	L 56–81	4–14 (1–6)	16 – Lewis	6 – Lewis	3 – Taylor	Hanner Fieldhouse (1,619); Statesboro, GA
Jan 30, 2020; 6:30 pm		at Appalachian State	L 37–65	4–15 (1–7)	10 – Hosendove	9 – Miller–McCray	2 – Henderson	Holmes Center (406); Boone, NC
Feb 1, 2020; 2:00 pm		at Coastal Carolina	L 45–87	4–16 (1–8)	10 – Lewis	10 – Hosendove	1 – Taylor	HTC Center (491); Conway, SC
Feb 6, 2020; 6:00 pm, ESPN+		Arkansas State	W 67–56	5–16 (2–8)	18 – Hosendove	10 – Hosendove	4 – Henderson	GSU Sports Arena (400); Atlanta, GA
Feb 8, 2020; 2:00 pm, ESPN+		Little Rock	W 58–43	6–16 (3–8)	23 – Hosendove	9 – J. Johnson	2 – Foster	GSU Sports Arena (530); Atlanta, GA
Feb 13, 2020; 7:00 pm		at Louisiana	W 61–53	7–16 (4–8)	12 – Taylor	12 – Miller–McCray	3 – Henderson	Cajundome (803); Lafayette, LA
Feb 15, 2020; 1:00 pm		at Louisiana–Monroe	W 52–43	8–16 (5–8)	10 – Henderson	8 – Hosendove	3 – Taylor	Fant–Ewing Coliseum (857); Monroe, LA
Feb 20, 2020; 6:00 pm, ESPN+		Appalachian State	L 59–64 ^{OT}	8–17 (5–9)	14 – Hosendove	15 – Hosendove	7 – Hosendove	GSU Sports Arena (416); Atlanta, GA
Feb 22, 2020; 2:00 pm, ESPN+		Coastal Carolina	L 50–66	8–18 (5–10)	12 – Miller–McCray	12 – Hosendove	4 – Hosendove	GSU Sports Arena (591); Atlanta, GA
Feb 27, 2020; 8:00 pm		at UT Arlington	L 32–58	8–19 (5–11)	12 – Taylor	5 – Taylor	3 – Taylor	College Park Center (1,120); Arlington, TX
Feb 29, 2020; 3:00 pm		at Texas State	L 62–67	8–20 (5–12)	23 – Hosendove	11 – Hosendove	2 – Taylor	Strahan Arena (1,119); San Marcos, TX
Mar 7, 2020; 2:00 pm, ESPN+		Georgia Southern; Modern Day Hate	L 74–77	8–21 (5–13)	21 – Lyons	9 – Hosendove	2 – Dziak	GSU Sports Arena (915); Atlanta, GA
*Non-conference game. ^{#}Rankings from AP Poll. (#) Tournament seedings in parentheses. All times are in Eastern Time.

== See also ==
- 2019–20 Georgia State Panthers men's basketball team
