= 2019–20 UT Arlington Mavericks women's basketball team =

American college basketball season

2019–20 UT Arlington Mavericks women's basketball
- Conference: Sun Belt Conference
- Record: 21–11 (14–4 Sun Belt)
- Head coach: Krista Gerlich (7th season)
- Assistant coaches: Talby Justus; Ashley Crawford; Jordan Vessels
- Home arena: College Park Center

2019–20 Sun Belt Conference women's basketball standings
	Conf.				Overall
Team	W		L	PCT	W		L	PCT
Troy*	16	–	2	.889	25	–	4	.862
Coastal Carolina	15	–	3	.833	25	–	4	.862
UT Arlington	14	–	4	.778	21	–	11	.656
Louisiana	10	–	8	.556	19	–	12	.613
South Alabama	9	–	9	.500	16	–	16	.500
Little Rock	9	–	9	.500	12	–	19	.387
Arkansas State	8	–	10	.444	12	–	18	.400
Appalachian State	8	–	10	.444	11	–	19	.367
Georgia Southern	7	–	11	.389	10	–	19	.345
Texas State	6	–	12	.333	13	–	17	.433
Georgia State	5	–	13	.278	8	–	21	.276
Louisiana–Monroe	1	–	17	.056	3	–	26	.103
† 2020 Sun Belt tournament winner

The 2019–20 UT Arlington Mavericks women's basketball team represented the University of Texas at Arlington in the 2019–20 NCAA Division I women's basketball season. The Mavericks, led by seventh-year head coach Krista Gerlich, played their home games at the College Park Center in Arlington, Texas and were members of the Sun Belt Conference. They finished the season 21–11, 14–4 in Sun Belt play, to finish third. They were invited to the Sun Belt tournament as the fourth seed and beat Texas State 74–50 in the first round before losing to South Alabama 5–47 in the quarterfinals. Shortly after being eliminated, the conference canceled the tournament due to the COVID-19 pandemic followed after with the NCAA canceling all postseason play.

== Preseason ==
=== Sun Belt coaches poll ===
On October 30, 2019, the Sun Belt released their preseason coaches poll with the Mavericks predicted to finish in third place in the conference.

Predicted finish	Team	Votes (1st place)
1	Little Rock	127 (6)
2	Troy	123 (4)
3	UT Arlington	120 (1)
4	South Alabama	119 (1)
5	Appalachian State	100
6	Georgia State	73
7	Coastal Carolina	66
8	Louisiana	64
9	Texas State	59
10	Arkansas State	44
11	Georgia Southern	26
12	Louisiana–Monroe	15

=== Sun Belt Preseason All-Conference team ===
2nd team

- Claire Chastain – SO, Guard

3rd team

- Katie Ferrell – SO, Forward

== Roster ==
2019–20 Texas–Arlington Mavericks women's basketball team
Players
Coaches

Pos.	#	Name	Height	Year	Previous school	Hometown
G	1	Katie Mayhue	5 ft 10 in (1.78 m)	So	South Albany HS; Montana	Albany, OR
C	3	Misty Dossey	6 ft 5 in (1.96 m)	So	Comanche	Comanche, OK
G	5	Jordynn Hernandez	5 ft 8 in (1.73 m)	RS Jr	McKinney Boyd HS; Collin College	McKinney, TX
F	12	Marie Benson	6 ft 1 in (1.85 m)	Sr	Midway HS; UTSA	Waco, TX
G	20	Claire Chastain	6 ft 0 in (1.83 m)	So	Dale	Shawnee, OK
G	21	Terryn Milton	5 ft 9 in (1.75 m)	So	Owasso High School	Owasso, OK
G	23	Camryn Hawkins	5 ft 10 in (1.78 m)	So	Rio Rancho	Albuquerque, NM
G	24	Aysia Evans	5 ft 6 in (1.68 m)	Sr	Broken Arrow	Tulsa, OK
F	31	Bre Wickware	6 ft 1 in (1.85 m)	RS Jr	Guyer; Indiana	Denton, TX
G	33	Barbara Benson	5 ft 11 in (1.8 m)	Jr	Midway HS; UTSA	Waco, TX
C	40	Michaela Wright	6 ft 5 in (1.96 m)	Jr	Father Tolton Catholic	Columbia, MO
G	41	Katie Ferrell	6 ft 1 in (1.85 m)	So	Plano	Plano, TX
F	45	Emma Halverson	6 ft 3 in (1.91 m)	So	Plano	Plano, TX

Head coach

- Krista Gerlich (Texas Tech)

Assistant coach(es)

- Talby Justus (Tabor)
- Ashley Crawford (Lamar)
- Jordan Vessels (West Texas A&M)

Legend

- (C) Team captain
- (S) Suspended
- (I) Ineligible
- (W) Walk-on
- Injured
- Current redshirt

Roster
Last update: July 19, 2024

== Schedule ==
Date time, TV	Rank^{#}	Opponent^{#}	Result	Record	High points	High rebounds	High assists	Site (attendance) city, state
Exhibition
October 30, 2019*; 7:00 p.m.		Midwestern State	W 63–42		11 – Evans	8 – Chastain	5 – Milton	College Park Center (401); Arlington, TX
Non-conference regular season
November 9, 2019*; 2:30 p.m.		Chicago State	W 84–53	1–0	24 – Dossey	10 – Ferrell	9 – Ferrell	College Park Center (1,715); Arlington, TX
November 15, 2019*; 7:00 p.m.		at North Texas	W 68–49	2–0	17 – M. Benson	12 – M. Benson	4 – Chastain	UNT Coliseum (643); Denton, TX
November 18, 2019*; 7:00 p.m.		at Grambling State	W 88–54	3–0	27 – M. Benson	13 – Ferrell	6 – Ferrell	Fredrick C. Hobdy Assembly Center (150); Grambling, LA
November 24, 2019*; 2:00 p.m.		at No. RV Kansas State	W 57–53	4–0	18 – Milton	7 – Ferrell	7 – Ferrell	Bramlage Coliseum (2,890); Manhattan, KS
November 28, 2019*; 4:00 p.m.		vs. No. 8 Louisville; Paradise Jam Island Tournament	L 67–76	4–1	22 – Chastain	8 – M. Benson	4 – Milton	Sports and Fitness Center; Saint Thomas, USVI
November 29, 2019*; 6:10 p.m.		vs. No. 1 Oregon; Paradise Jam Island Tournament	L 54–91	4–2	15 – M. Benson	5 – Ferrell	2 – Mayhue	Sports and Fitness Center (771); Saint Thomas, USVI
November 30, 2019*; 4:00 p.m.		vs. No. RV Oklahoma State; Paradise Jam Island Tournament	L 47–60	4–3	19 – Evans	7 – TEAM	4 – Milton	Sports and Fitness Center; Saint Thomas, USVI
December 4, 2019*; 7:00 p.m.		Wright State; Frozen Night	W 68–62	5–3	26 – M. Benson	7 – M. Benson	4 – Milton	College Park Center (882); Arlington, TX
December 16, 2019*; 11:00 a.m.		at Northwestern	L 47–74	5–4	16 – M. Benson	8 – M. Benson	3 – Ferrell	Welsh–Ryan Arena (3,432); Evanston, IL
December 19, 2019*; 7:00 p.m.		Marist; Holiday Hoops	L 57–73	5–5	18 – M. Benson	9 – M. Benson	6 – Milton	College Park Center (921); Arlington, TX
December 22, 2019*; 2:00 p.m.		SMU; Holiday Hoops/Blaze's Kids Club Day	W 51–46	6–5	12 – M. Benson	8 – Ferrell	6 – Dossey	College Park Center (1,182); Arlington, TX
December 30, 2019*; 7:00 p.m.		Texas Southern; Holiday Hoops	L 63–74	6–6	28 – M. Benson	10 – M. Benson	3 – Chastain	College Park Center (915); Arlington, TX
Sun Belt regular season
January 2, 2020; 7:00 p.m.		Arkansas State; Holiday Hoops	W 71–44	7–6 (1–0)	18 – Chastain	8 – Ferrell	9 – Ferrell	College Park Center (1,072); Arlington, TX
January 4, 2020; 2:00 p.m.		Little Rock	W 65–58	8–6 (2–0)	25 – M. Benson	7 – M. Benson	7 – Ferrell	College Park Center (1,079); Arlington, TX
January 9, 2020; 6:30 p.m.		at Appalachian State	W 82–60	9–6 (3–0)	21 – Chastain	5 – Halverston	10 – Milton	Holmes Convocation Center (436); Boone, NC
January 11, 2020; 2:00 p.m.		at Coastal Carolina	L 56–62	9–7 (3–1)	12 – M. Benson	7 – M. Benson	4 – Chastain	HTC Center (297); Conway, SC
January 16, 2020; 11:30 a.m.		Louisiana	W 79–52	10–7 (4–1)	30 – M. Benson	9 – Dossey	5 – Milton	College Park Center (5,714); Arlington, TX
January 18, 2020; 2:00 p.m.		Louisiana–Monroe; Dallas Wings Day/Nat'l Girls and Women in Sports Day	W 72–34	11–7 (5–1)	20 – Evans	10 – M. Benson	5 – Milton	College Park Center (1,002); Arlington, TX
January 23, 2020; 7:00 p.m., 5		at South Alabama	W 68–45	12–7 (6–1)	14 – Dossey	16 – M. Benson	3 – Milton	Mitchell Center (395); Mobile, AL
January 25, 2020; 2:00 p.m.		at Troy	L 69–85	12–8 (6–2)	21 – Chastain	5 – Wickware	3 – Milton	Trojan Arena (1,899); Troy, AL
February 1, 2020; 2:00 p.m.		at Texas State	L 55–72	12–9 (6–3)	19 – M. Benson	11 – M. Benson	3 – Milton	Strahan Arena (2,703); San Marcos, TX
February 6, 2020; 7:00 p.m.		Appalachian State; FSL Night/School Staff Appreciation Night	W 63–44	13–9 (7–3)	16 – M. Benson	9 – Ferrell	7 – Ferrell	College Park Center (988); Arlington, TX
February 8, 2020; 2:00 p.m.		Coastal Carolina	L 62–80	13–10 (7–4)	24 – Evans	6 – Chastain	4 – Chastain	College Park Center (1,104); Arlington, TX
February 13, 2020; 6:30 p.m.		at Arkansas State	W 89–62	14–10 (8–4)	20 – M. Benson	10 – M. Benson	8 – Milton	First National Bank Arena (679); Jonesboro, AR
February 15, 2020; 2:00 p.m.		at Little Rock	W 62–46	15–10 (9–4)	17 – M. Benson	14 – M. Benson	3 – Evans	Jack Stephens Center (925); Little Rock, AR
February 22, 2020; 5:00 p.m.		Texas State; Military/1st Responder Appreciation Day	W 69–49	16–10 (10–4)	20 – M. Benson	14 – M. Benson	5 – Milton	College Park Center (1,751); Arlington, TX
February 27, 2020; 7:00 p.m.		Georgia State	W 58–32	17–10 (11–4)	15 – M. Benson	10 – Ferrell	6 – Milton	College Park Center (1,120); Arlington, TX
February 29, 2020; 2:00 p.m.		Georgia Southern; Senior Day	W 101–73	18–10 (12–4)	22 – Chastain	9 – Ferrell	12 – Milton	College Park Center (1,108); Arlington, TX
March 5, 2020; 6:00 p.m.		at Louisiana	W 73–66	19–10 (13–4)	19 – M. Benson	8 – Ferrell	7 – Milton	Earl K. Long Gymnasium (843); Lafayette, LA
March 7, 2020; 12:00 p.m.		at Louisiana–Monroe	W 74–67	20–10 (14–4)	29 – M. Benson	14 – M. Benson	5 – Milton	Fant–Ewing Coliseum (990); Monroe, LA
Sun Belt women's tournament
March 10, 2020; 6:00 p.m.	(3)	(10) Texas State; First round	W 74–50	21–10	15 – M. Benson	9 – Dossey	6 – Milton	College Park Center (1,002); Arlington, TX
March 11, 2020; 7:00 p.m.	(3)	(6) South Alabama; Quarterfinals	L 47–55	21–11	12 – Chastain	15 – Ferrell	5 – Ferrell	College Park Center (848); Arlington, TX
*Non-conference game. ^{#}Rankings from AP poll. (#) Tournament seedings in parentheses. All times are in Central.

== See also ==
- 2019–20 UT Arlington Mavericks men's basketball team
