= 2019–20 Texas State Bobcats women's basketball team =

Intercollegiate basketball season

2019–20 Texas State Bobcats women's basketball
- Conference: Sun Belt Conference
- Record: 13–17 (6–12 Sun Belt)
- Head coach: Zenarae Antoine (8th season)
- Assistant coaches: Chandra Dorsey; Nathan Teymer
- Home arena: Strahan Coliseum

2019–20 Sun Belt Conference women's basketball standings
	Conf.				Overall
Team	W		L	PCT	W		L	PCT
Troy*	16	–	2	.889	25	–	4	.862
Coastal Carolina	15	–	3	.833	25	–	4	.862
UT Arlington	14	–	4	.778	21	–	11	.656
Louisiana	10	–	8	.556	19	–	12	.613
South Alabama	9	–	9	.500	16	–	16	.500
Little Rock	9	–	9	.500	12	–	19	.387
Arkansas State	8	–	10	.444	12	–	18	.400
Appalachian State	8	–	10	.444	11	–	19	.367
Georgia Southern	7	–	11	.389	10	–	19	.345
Texas State	6	–	12	.333	13	–	17	.433
Georgia State	5	–	13	.278	8	–	21	.276
Louisiana–Monroe	1	–	17	.056	3	–	26	.103
† 2020 Sun Belt tournament winner

The 2019–20 Texas State Bobcats women's basketball team represented Texas State University in the 2019–20 NCAA Division I women's basketball season. The Bobcats, led by eight year head coach Zenarae Antoine, played their home games at Strahan Coliseum and were members of the Sun Belt Conference. They finished the season 13–17, 6–12 in Sun Belt play to finish in tenth place. They lost in the first round of the Sun Belt women's tournament to UT Arlington 50-74. Shortly after being eliminated, the Sun Belt cancelled the remainder of the season, which was followed by the NCAA cancelling all post-season play due to the COVID-19 pandemic

== Preseason ==
=== Sun Belt coaches poll ===
On October 30, 2019, the Sun Belt released their preseason coaches poll with the Bobcats predicted to finish in ninth place in the conference.

Predicted finish	Team	Votes (1st place)
1	Little Rock	127 (6)
2	Troy	123 (4)
3	UT Arlington	120 (1)
4	South Alabama	119 (1)
5	Appalachian State	100
6	Georgia State	73
7	Coastal Carolina	66
8	Louisiana	64
9	Texas State	59
10	Arkansas State	44
11	Georgia Southern	26
12	Louisiana–Monroe	15

=== Sun Belt Preseason All-Conference team ===
No members of the team were chosen to the preseason team

== Roster ==
2019–20 Texas State Bobcats women's basketball team
Players
Coaches

Pos.	#	Name	Height	Year	Previous school	Hometown
F	00	Jayla Johnson	6 ft 1 in (1.85 m)	Jr	Lincoln HS	Dallas, TX
G	1	Avionne Alexander	5 ft 8 in (1.73 m)	Jr	Sunnyvale HS	Sunnyvale, TX
G	3	Kennedy Taylor	5 ft 3 in (1.6 m)	So	Lincoln HS	Dallas, TX
G	5	Jessica Paz y Puente	5 ft 9 in (1.75 m)	Fr	Tom C. Clark HS	San Antonio, TX
G	13	Kelsyn King	5 ft 8 in (1.73 m)	RS Fr	Mansfield Legacy HS	Burleson, TX
G	15	Ja'Kayla Bowie	5 ft 8 in (1.73 m)	So	Robert E. Lee HS	Tyler, TX
F	20	Chelsea Johnson	6 ft 1 in (1.85 m)	Fr	Loyola College Prep	Shreveport, LA
G	24	Brooke Holle	5 ft 7 in (1.7 m)	Sr	Westlake HS	Austin, TX
F	25	Lauryn Thompson	6 ft 1 in (1.85 m)	So	Mansfield Timberview HS; VCU	Arlington, TX
F	32	Da'Nasia Hood	6 ft 1 in (1.85 m)	So	Wagner HS	San Antonio, TX
G	33	Bailey Holle	5 ft 7 in (1.7 m)	Sr	Westlake HS	Austin, TX
C	55	Jaeda Reed	6 ft 1 in (1.85 m)	So	Eisenhower HS	Lawton, OK

Head coach

- Zenarae Antoine (Colorado State)

Assistant coach(es)

- Chandra Dorsey (Mississippi)
- Nathan Teymer (Grand View)

Legend

- (C) Team captain
- (S) Suspended
- (I) Ineligible
- (W) Walk-on
- Injured
- Current redshirt

Roster
Last update: 12 August 2020

== Schedule ==
Date time, TV	Rank^{#}	Opponent^{#}	Result	Record	High points	High rebounds	High assists	Site (attendance) city, state
Non-conference regular season
Nov 5, 2019*; 5:30 pm, ESPN+		Texas Lutheran	W 72–31	1–0	18 – Reed	7 – Alexander	4 – Taylor	Strahan Arena; San Marcos, TX
Nov 8, 2019*; 5:00 pm		at Oral Roberts	L 57–63	1–1	17 – Hood	8 – Hood	7 – Taylor	Mabee Center (1,260); Tulsa, OK
Nov 16, 2019*; 11:00 am		UT Permian Basin	W 83–45	2–1	21 – Holle	9 – Johnson	7 – Taylor	Strahan Arena (903); San Marcos, TX
Nov 24, 2019*; 2:00 pm, ESPN+		at Kansas	L 48–68	2–2	14 – Taylor	8 – Holle	4 – Holle	Allen Fieldhouse (1,433); Lawrence, KS
Nov 27, 2019*; 7:00 pm, ESPN+		New Orleans	W 51–49	3–2	12 – Taylor	7 – Moore	4 – Taylor	Strahan Arena (912); San Marcos, TX
Nov 30, 2019*; 2:00 pm, ESPN+		Texas A&M–Corpus Christi	W 57–48	4–2	19 – Hood	6 – Hood	8 – Taylor	Strahan Arena; San Marcos, TX
Dec 4, 2019*; 7:00 pm, ESPN+		UTSA	W 74–69 ^{OT}	5–2	22 – Taylor	6 – Hood	4 – Alexander	Strahan Arena (1,087); San Marcos, TX
Dec 15, 2019*; 1:00 pm, ESPN+		at Dartmouth	W 61–51	6–2	18 – Reed	7 – Alexander	4 – Taylor	Leede Arena (560); Hanover, NH
Dec 18, 2019*; 11:00 am		at Morgan State	L 62–72	6–3	15 – Holle	6 – Holle	7 – Alexander	Hill Fieldhouse (67); Baltimore, MD
Dec 22, 2018*; 12:00 pm		at No. RV TCU	L 52–79	6–4	13 – Taylor	7 – Holle	6 – Taylor	Schollmaier Arena (1,699); Fort Worth, TX
Dec 30, 2019*; 7:00 pm, ESPN+		Alcorn State	W 67–59	7–4	18 – Johnson	14 – Hood	8 – Taylor	Strahan Arena (971); San Marcos, TX
Sun Belt regular season
Jan 2, 2020; 7:00 pm, ESPN+		Little Rock	L 66–78	7–5 (0–1)	22 – Holle	11 – Reed	5 – Taylor	Strahan Arena (895); San Marcos, TX
Jan 4, 2020; 2:00 pm, ESPN+		Arkansas State	L 53–56	7–6 (0–2)	14 – Hood	8 – Holle	4 – Alexander	Strahan Arena (925); San Marcos, TX
Jan 9, 2020; 5:00 pm, ESPN+		at Coastal Carolina	L 67–75	7–7 (0–3)	23 – Hood	7 – TEAM	10 – Taylor	HTC Center (199); Conway, SC
Jan 11, 2020; 1:00 pm, ESPN+		at Appalachian State	L 65–73 ^{OT}	7–8 (0–4)	18 – Hood	7 – Alexander	6 – Taylor	Holmes Center (489); Boone, NC
Jan 16, 2020; 7:00 pm, ESPN+		Louisiana–Monroe	L 55–58	7–9 (0–5)	20 – Hood	8 – Holle	5 – Holle	Strahan Arena (904); San Marcos, TX
Jan 18, 2020; 2:00 pm, ESPN+		Louisiana	L 67–73	7–10 (0–6)	15 – Holle	11 – Holle	5 – Holle	Strahan Arena (1,132); San Marcos, TX
Jan 23, 2020; 6:00 pm, ESPN+		at Troy	L 50–84	7–11 (0–7)	12 – Johnson	6 – Holle	5 – Taylor	Trojan Arena (1,789); Troy, AL
Jan 25, 2020; 5:00 pm, ESPN+		at South Alabama	L 76–78 ^{2OT}	7–12 (0–8)	17 – Hood	14 – Hood	9 – Taylor	Mitchell Center (1,934); Mobile, AL
Feb 1, 2020; 2:00 pm, ESPN+		UT Arlington; Play4Kay Breast Cancer Awareness	W 72–55	8–12 (1–8)	28 – Hood	11 – Holle	13 – Taylor	Strahan Arena (2,703); San Marcos, TX
Feb 6, 2020; 7:00 pm, ESPN+		Coastal Carolina	L 59–69	8–13 (1–9)	18 – Hood	8 – Holle	5 – Taylor	Strahan Arena (1,209); San Marcos, TX
Feb 8, 2020; 2:00 pm, ESPN+		Appalachian State	L 47–59	8–14 (1–10)	14 – Johnson	9 – TEAM	5 – Taylor	Strahan Arena (1,045); San Marcos, TX
Feb 13, 2020; 11:30 am, ESPN+		at Little Rock	W 50–47	9–14 (2–10)	17 – Hood	14 – Hood	4 – Taylor	Jack Stephens Center (2,557); Little Rock, AR
Feb 15, 2020; 4:00 pm, ESPN+		at Arkansas State	W 83–69	10–14 (3–10)	21 – Hood	11 – Holle	11 – Taylor	First National Bank Arena (1,012); Jonesboro, AR
Feb 22, 2020; 5:00 pm, ESPN+		at UT Arlington	L 49–69	10–15 (3–11)	15 – Taylor	6 – Hood	3 – Taylor	College Park Center (1,751); Arlington, TX
Feb 27, 2020; 11:30 am, ESPN+		Georgia Southern	W 72–68	11–15 (4–11)	16 – Hood	11 – Hood	8 – Taylor	Strahan Arena (3,385); San Marcos, TX
Feb 29, 2020; 2:00 pm, ESPN+		Georgia State	W 67–62	12–15 (5–11)	18 – Hood	8 – Hood	8 – Taylor	Strahan Arena (1,119); San Marcos, TX
Mar 5, 2020; 6:00 pm, ESPN+		at Louisiana–Monroe	W 59–53	13–15 (6–11)	15 – Hood	9 – Johnson	5 – Holle	Fant–Ewing Coliseum (853); Monroe, LA
Mar 7, 2020; 2:00 pm, ESPN+		at Louisiana	L 64–70	13–16 (6–12)	16 – Hood	7 – Reed	7 – Taylor	Cajundome (1,261); Lafayette, LA
Sun Belt Women's Tournament
Mar 10, 2020; 6:00 pm, ESPN+	(10)	at (3) UT Arlington; First Round	L 50–74	13–17	11 – Taylor	7 – Hood	5 – Taylor	College Park Center; Arlington, TX
*Non-conference game. ^{#}Rankings from AP Poll. (#) Tournament seedings in parentheses. All times are in Central Time.

== See also ==
- 2019–20 Texas State Bobcats men's basketball team
