= 2019–20 Arkansas State Red Wolves women's basketball team =

Intercollegiate basketball season

2019–20 Arkansas State Red Wolves women's basketball
- Conference: Sun Belt Conference
- Record: 11–19 (8–10 Sun Belt)
- Head coach: Matt Daniel (1st season)
- Assistant coaches: Destinee Rogers; Caronica Williams
- Home arena: First National Bank Arena

2019–20 Sun Belt Conference women's basketball standings
	Conf.				Overall
Team	W		L	PCT	W		L	PCT
Troy*	16	–	2	.889	25	–	4	.862
Coastal Carolina	15	–	3	.833	25	–	4	.862
UT Arlington	14	–	4	.778	21	–	11	.656
Louisiana	10	–	8	.556	19	–	12	.613
South Alabama	9	–	9	.500	16	–	16	.500
Little Rock	9	–	9	.500	12	–	19	.387
Arkansas State	8	–	10	.444	12	–	18	.400
Appalachian State	8	–	10	.444	11	–	19	.367
Georgia Southern	7	–	11	.389	10	–	19	.345
Texas State	6	–	12	.333	13	–	17	.433
Georgia State	5	–	13	.278	8	–	21	.276
Louisiana–Monroe	1	–	17	.056	3	–	26	.103
† 2020 Sun Belt tournament winner

The 2019–20 Arkansas State Red Wolves women's basketball team represented Arkansas State University during the 2019–20 NCAA Division I women's basketball season. The Red Wolves, led by first year head coach Matt Daniel, played their home games at First National Bank Arena in Jonesboro, Arkansas as members of the Sun Belt Conference. They finished the season 11–19, 8–10 in Sun Belt play to finish in a seventh place. They lost in the first round of the Sun Belt women's tournament to South Alabama.

== Preseason ==
=== Sun Belt coaches poll ===
On October 30, 2019, the Sun Belt released their preseason coaches poll with the Red Wolves predicted to finish in tenth place in the conference.

Predicted finish	Team	Votes (1st place)
1	Little Rock	127 (6)
2	Troy	123 (4)
3	UT Arlington	120 (1)
4	South Alabama	119 (1)
5	Appalachian State	100
6	Georgia State	73
7	Coastal Carolina	66
8	Louisiana	64
9	Texas State	59
10	Arkansas State	44
11	Georgia Southern	26
12	Louisiana–Monroe	15

=== Sun Belt Preseason All-Conference team ===
3rd team
- Peyton Martin – JR, Forward

== Roster ==
2019–20 Arkansas State Red Wolves women's basketball team
Players
Coaches

Pos.	#	Name	Height	Year	Previous school	Hometown
G	0	Jada Ford	5 ft 9 in (1.75 m)	Sr	Muskogee HS	Muskogee, OK
G	1	Jireh Washington	5 ft 9 in (1.75 m)	So	Central HS	Memphis, TN
G	2	Starr Taylor	5 ft 6 in (1.68 m)	Sr	Jonesboro HS	Jonesboro, AR
G	3	Morgan Wallace	5 ft 10 in (1.78 m)	Jr	Pulaski Academy	Little Rock, AR
G	4	Mya Love	5 ft 8 in (1.73 m)	Fr	Nettleton HS	Jonesboro, AR
G	5	Payton Tennison	5 ft 11 in (1.8 m)	Sr	Valley Springs HS	Valley Springs, AR
G	10	Jada Stinson	5 ft 8 in (1.73 m)	RS Jr	Elizabethtown HS; Memphis	Elizabethtown, KY
F	13	Talia Roldan	6 ft 4 in (1.93 m)	Jr	Andrean HS; UAB	Merrillville, IN
G	14	Hailee Erickson	5 ft 5 in (1.65 m)	Jr	Alton HS; Three Rivers College	Alton, MO
F	21	Shameka Tubbs	6 ft 0 in (1.83 m)	RS Jr	Northridge HS; Labette CC	Tuscaloosa, AL
G	22	Maggie Mahan	5 ft 9 in (1.75 m)	Jr	Nemo Vista HS	Center Ridge, AR
F	23	Trinitee Jackson	6 ft 3 in (1.91 m)	So	Christian County HS	Hopkinsville, KY
F	25	Kayla Williams	6 ft 1 in (1.85 m)	RS Jr	Overton HS; Wichita State	Memphis, TN
F	35	Peyton Martin	5 ft 11 in (1.8 m)	Jr	Watson Chapel HS	Pine Bluff, AR
F	50	Madison Heckert	6 ft 4 in (1.93 m)	Sr	West Carroll HS	Atwood, TN

Head coach

- Matt Daniel (Harding)

Assistant coach(es)

- Caronica Williams (Marshall)
- Destinee Rogers (Central Arkansas)

Legend

- (C) Team captain
- (S) Suspended
- (I) Ineligible
- (W) Walk-on
- Injured
- Current redshirt

Roster
Last update: 2 August 2020

== Schedule ==
Date time, TV	Rank^{#}	Opponent^{#}	Result	Record	High points	High rebounds	High assists	Site (attendance) city, state
Non-conference regular season
Nov 6, 2019*; 5:00 pm		Central Baptist	W 88–63	1–0	26 – Tennison	17 – Jackson	7 – Washington	First National Bank Arena (948); Jonesboro, AR
Nov 9, 2019*; 2:00 pm, ESPN3		at Tulsa	L 77–79	1–1	24 – Washington	14 – Martin	5 – Washington	Reynolds Center (791); Tulsa, OK
Nov 13, 2019*; 7:00 pm, ESPN+		Southeast Missouri State	L 67–79	1–2	19 – Martin	9 – Martin	5 – Wallace	First National Bank Arena (816); Jonesboro, AR
Nov 22, 2019*; 11:00 am		at No. 19 DePaul; Maggie Dixon Classic	L 64–109	1–3	21 – Wallace	5 – Wallace	5 – Washington	McGrath–Phillips Arena; Chicago, IL
Nov 23, 2019*; 1:00 pm		vs. North Carolina A&T; Maggie Dixon Classic	L 50–55	1–4	16 – Wallace	7 – Wallace	3 – Wallace	McGrath–Phillips Arena; Chicago, IL
Nov 26, 2019*; 6:00 pm, ESPN+		at Murray State	L 62–77	1–5	23 – Martin	10 – Wallace	4 – Washington	CFSB Center (343); Murray, KY
Nov 30, 2019*; 3:00 pm		at San Diego State	W 71–62	2–5	20 – Washington	8 – Wallace	3 – Taylor	Viejas Arena (1,788); San Diego, CA
Dec 9, 2019*; 7:00 pm, ESPN+		Arkansas–Pine Bluff	W 81–60	3–5	18 – Martin	9 – Martin	8 – Washington	First National Bank Arena (591); Jonesboro, AR
Dec 14, 2019*; 12:00 pm		at Memphis	L 50–78	3–6	13 – Ford	8 – Wallace	2 – Washington	Elma Roane Fieldhouse (392); Memphis, TN
Dec 18, 2019*; 12:00 pm, ESPN+		at No. 5 Baylor	L 43–111	3–7	16 – Washington	6 – Washington	7 – Taylor	Ferrell Center (10,248); Waco, TX
Dec 29, 2019*; 2:00 pm		at Louisiana Tech	L 54–67	3–8	17 – Ford	7 – Martin	3 – Washington	Thomas Assembly Center (1,173); Ruston, LA
Sun Belt regular season
Jan 2 2020; 7:00 pm, ESPN+		at UT Arlington	L 44–71	3–9 (0–1)	14 – Ford	7 – Wallace	2 – Wallace	College Park Center (1,072); Arlington, TX
Jan 4, 2020; 2:00 pm, ESPN+		at Texas State	W 56–53	4–9 (1–1)	16 – Washington	9 – Wallace	2 – Ford	Strahan Coliseum (925); San Marcos, TX
Jan 9, 2020; 7:00 pm, ESPN+		Georgia State	W 70–68 ^{OT}	5–9 (2–1)	21 – Wallace	11 – Wallace	6 – Washington	First National Bank Arena (613); Jonesboro, AR
Jan 11, 2020; 1:00 pm, ESPN+		Georgia Southern	W 69–62	6–9 (3–1)	17 – Martin	7 – Wallace	6 – Washington	First National Bank Arena (718); Jonesboro, AR
Jan 16, 2020; 7:00 pm, ESPN+		Appalachian State	W 76–58	7–9 (4–1)	20 – Martin	10 – Wallace	6 – Washington	First National Bank Arena (619); Jonesboro, AR
Jan 18, 2020; 2:00 pm, ESPN+		at Little Rock	L 58–67	7–10 (4–2)	23 – Washington	9 – Martin	3 – Washington	Jack Stephens Center (1,034); Little Rock, AR
Jan 23, 2020; 6:00 pm, ESPN+		at Louisiana	L 43–83	7–11 (4–3)	9 – Washington	6 – Wallace	3 – Washington	Cajundome (801); Lafayette, LA
Jan 25, 2020; 4:00 pm, ESPN+		Coastal Carolina	W 63–61	8–11 (5–3)	20 – Washington	14 – Wallace	6 – Washington	First National Bank Arena (646); Jonesboro, AR
Feb 1, 2020; 12:00 pm, ESPN+		at Louisiana–Monroe	W 54–53	9–11 (6–3)	20 – Washington	14 – Wallace	6 – Washington	Fant–Ewing Coliseum (646); Monroe, LA
Feb 6, 2020; 5:00 pm, ESPN+		Georgia State	L 56–67	9–12 (6–4)	18 – Tennison	11 – Wallace	6 – Washington	GSU Sports Arena (400); Atlanta, GA
Feb 8, 2020; 1:00 pm, ESPN+		at Georgia Souther	L 67–80	9–13 (6–5)	20 – Washington	8 – Martin	5 – Washington	Hanner Fieldhouse (530); Statesboro, GA
Feb 13, 2020; 7:00 pm, ESPN+		UT Arlington	L 62–89	9–14 (6–6)	16 – Martin	5 – Wallace	3 – Washington	First National Bank Arena (679); Jonesboro, AR
Feb 15, 2020; 4:00 pm, ESPN+		Texas State	L 69–83	9–15 (6–7)	15 – Washington	8 – Washington	4 – Washington	First National Bank Arena (1,012); Jonesboro, AR
Feb 20, 2020; 11:00 am, ESPN+		at South Alabama	L 71–87	9–16 (6–8)	15 – Tennison	5 – Tennison	5 – Washington	Mitchell Center (2,104); Mobile, AL
Feb 22, 2020; 4:00 pm, ESPN+		at Troy	L 64–79	9–17 (6–9)	12 – Wallace	10 – TEAM	3 – Martin	Trojan Arena (2,120); Troy, AL
Feb 28, 2020; 7:00 pm, ESPN+		Little Rock	W 72–54	10–17 (7–9)	18 – Martin	12 – Martin	8 – Washington	First National Bank Arena (819); Jonesboro, AR
Mar 5, 2020; 7:00 pm, ESPN+		South Alabama	W 86–80	11–17 (8–9)	20 – Washington	12 – Wallace	5 – Tennison	First National Bank Arena (519); Jonesboro, AR
Mar 7, 2020; 4:00 pm, ESPN+		Troy	L 81–91	11–18 (8–10)	16 – Wallace	15 – Wallace	5 – Taylor	First National Bank Arena (791); Jonesboro, AR
Sun Belt Women's Tournament
Mar 10, 2020; 8:20 pm, ESPN+	(7)	vs. (6) South Alabama; First Round	L 71–82	11–19	18 – Wallace	10 – Wallace	3 – Ford	College Park Center (1,002); Arlington, TX
*Non-conference game. ^{#}Rankings from AP Poll. (#) Tournament seedings in parentheses. All times are in Eastern Time.

== See also ==
2019–20 Arkansas State Red Wolves men's basketball team
