= 2019–20 Troy Trojans women's basketball team =

Intercollegiate basketball season

2019–20 Troy Trojans women's basketball

Las Vegas Holiday Classic champions Sun Belt Regular Season champions
- Conference: Sun Belt Conference
- Record: 25–4 (16–2 Sun Belt)
- Head coach: Chanda Rigby (8th season)
- Assistant coaches: Jennifer Graf; Courtney Simmons; Neil Harrow
- Home arena: Trojan Arena

2019–20 Sun Belt Conference women's basketball standings
	Conf.				Overall
Team	W		L	PCT	W		L	PCT
Troy*	16	–	2	.889	25	–	4	.862
Coastal Carolina	15	–	3	.833	25	–	4	.862
UT Arlington	14	–	4	.778	21	–	11	.656
Louisiana	10	–	8	.556	19	–	12	.613
South Alabama	9	–	9	.500	16	–	16	.500
Little Rock	9	–	9	.500	12	–	19	.387
Arkansas State	8	–	10	.444	12	–	18	.400
Appalachian State	8	–	10	.444	11	–	19	.367
Georgia Southern	7	–	11	.389	10	–	19	.345
Texas State	6	–	12	.333	13	–	17	.433
Georgia State	5	–	13	.278	8	–	21	.276
Louisiana–Monroe	1	–	17	.056	3	–	26	.103
† 2020 Sun Belt tournament winner

The 2019–20 Troy Trojans women's basketball team represented Troy University during the 2019–20 NCAA Division I women's basketball season. The Trojans, led by seventh year head coach Chanda Rigby, played their home games at Trojan Arena and were members of the Sun Belt Conference. They finished the season 25–4, 16–2 in Sun Belt play to finish regular season champions. They received a first and second round bye in the Sun Belt tournament after being seeded 1st. Before their first game, the tournament was canceled due to the COVID-19 pandemic.

== Preseason ==
=== Sun Belt coaches poll ===
On October 30, 2019, the Sun Belt released their preseason coaches poll with the Trojans predicted to finish in second place in the conference.

Predicted finish	Team	Votes (1st place)
1	Little Rock	127 (6)
2	Troy	123 (4)
3	UT Arlington	120 (1)
4	South Alabama	119 (1)
5	Appalachian State	100
6	Georgia State	73
7	Coastal Carolina	66
8	Louisiana	64
9	Texas State	59
10	Arkansas State	44
11	Georgia Southern	26
12	Louisiana–Monroe	15

=== Sun Belt Preseason All-Conference team ===
2nd team

- Amber Rivers – SR, Forward

3rd team

- Japonica James – SR, Forward

== Roster ==
2019–20 Troy Trojans women's basketball team
Players
Coaches

Pos.	#	Name	Height	Year	Previous school	Hometown
G	0	Emely Rosario	5 ft 6 in (1.68 m)	Jr	Marist HS; Kilgore College	Bronx, NY
G	1	Kayla Robinson	5 ft 5 in (1.65 m)	Sr	Effingham County HS	Savannah, GA
G	2	Shawnta Shaw	5 ft 2 in (1.57 m)	So	Pearl-Cohn Comprehensive HS	Nashville, TN
G	4	Jasmine Robinson	5 ft 6 in (1.68 m)	Jr	Academy of Richmond County	Augusta, GA
F	5	Tyasia Moore	6 ft 0 in (1.83 m)	Jr	Forestville Military Academy; Trinity Valley CC	Washington, DC
G	10	Janiah Sandifer	5 ft 7 in (1.7 m)	Jr	Pearl-Cohn	Nashville, TN
G	11	Jasmine LeBlanc	5 ft 10 in (1.78 m)	RS Sr	Breaux Bridge HS; Louisiana Tech	Breaux Bridge, LA
G	12	Harriet Winchester	5 ft 11 in (1.8 m)	Sr	Keith HS	Safrord, AL
G	14	Tiyah Johnson	5 ft 10 in (1.78 m)	Jr	Central HS; Shelton State CC	Phenix City, AL
F	20	Japonica James	5 ft 11 in (1.8 m)	Sr	LaFlore HS; Tallahassee CC	Mobile, AL
F	21	Jhileiya Dunlap	6 ft 2 in (1.88 m)	Sr	Dreher HS; Ole Miss	Columbia, SC
F	25	Alexus Dye	6 ft 0 in (1.83 m)	Jr	Wenonah HS; Gulf Coast State College	Birmingham, AL
F	32	Katie Rogers	6 ft 2 in (1.88 m)	Sr	Wenonah HS; Ole Miss	Birmingham, AL
F	40	Amber Rivers	6 ft 2 in (1.88 m)	Sr	Center Point HS	Birmingham, AL

Head coach

- Chanda Rigby (Southeastern Louisiana)

Assistant coach(es)

- Jennifer Graf (Northwestern State)
- Courtney Simmons (Louisville)
- Neil Harrow (East Central)

Legend

- (C) Team captain
- (S) Suspended
- (I) Ineligible
- (W) Walk-on
- Injured
- Current redshirt

Roster
Last update: 28 July 2020

== Schedule ==
Date time, TV	Rank^{#}	Opponent^{#}	Result	Record	Site (attendance) city, state
Non-conference regular season
Nov 5, 2019*; 6:00 pm		Fort Valley State	W 101–52	1–0	Trojan Arena (2,539); Troy, AL
Nov 12, 2019*; 6:00 pm		Samford	W 74–65	2–0	Pete Hanna Center (199); Homewood, AL
Nov 16, 2019*; 2:00 pm		Jacksonville State	W 94–64	3–0	Trojan Arena (1,245); Troy, AL
Nov 18, 2019*; 7:00 pm		at No. 8 Mississippi State	L 82–122	3–1	Humphrey Coliseum (6,839); Starkville, MS
Nov 24, 2019*; 2:00 pm		at Duke	L 85–99	3–2	Cameron Indoor Stadium (2,833); Durham, NC
Dec 1, 2019*; 3:00 pm		at Bethune–Cookman	W 68–62	4–2	Moore Gymnasium (205); Daytona Beach, FL
Dec 4, 2019*; 5:00 pm		Auburn–Montgomery	W 72–42	5–2	Trojan Arena (1,218); Troy, AL
Dec 11, 2019*; 12:00 pm		East Tennessee State	W 79–61	6–2	Trojan Arena (1,569); Troy, AL
Dec 15, 2019*; 1:30 pm		at Chattanooga	W 90–51	7–2	McKenzie Arena; Chattanooga, TN
Dec 19, 2019*; 5:30 pm		vs. Toledo; Las Vegas Holiday Hoops Classic	W 71–64	8–2	South Point Hotel and Casino (150); Las Vegas, NV
Dec 20, 2019*; 2:00 pm		vs. Kent State; Las Vegas Holiday Hoops Classic	W 71–64	9–2	South Point Casino and Hotel (150); Las Vegas, NV
Sun Belt regular season
Jan 2, 2020; 6:00 pm		Coastal Carolina	W 84–77	10–2 (1–0)	Trojan Arena (1,439); Troy, AL
Jan 4, 2020; 2:00 pm		Appalachian State	W 84–55	11–2 (2–0)	Trojan Arena (1,112); Troy, AL
Jan 8, 2020; 6:00 pm		at Louisiana–Monroe	W 72–65	12–2 (3–0)	Fant–Ewing Coliseum (457); Monroe, LA
Jan 11, 2020; 2:00 pm		Louisiana	L 73–79	12–3 (3–1)	Trojan Arena (1,242); Troy, AL
Jan 16, 2020; 6:30 pm		at Georgia Southern	W 79–69	13–3 (4–1)	Hanner Fieldhouse (411); Statesboro, GA
Jan 18, 2020; 2:00 pm		at Georgia State	W 71–57	14–3 (5–1)	GSU Sports Arena (449); Atlanta, GA
Jan 23, 2020; 6:00 pm		Texas State	W 84–50	15–3 (6–1)	Trojan Arena (1,789); Troy, AL
Jan 25, 2020; 2:00 pm		UT Arlington	W 85–69	16–3 (7–1)	Trojan Arena (1,899); Troy, AL
Feb 1, 2020; 2:00 pm		South Alabama	W 85–68	17–3 (8–1)	Trojan Arena (1,783); Troy, AL
Feb 5, 2020; 6:00 pm		Louisiana–Monroe	W 77–65	18–3 (9–1)	Trojan Arena (1,648); Troy, AL
Feb 8, 2020; 2:00 pm		at Louisiana	W 67–64	19–3 (10–1)	Cajundome (892); Lafayette, LA
Feb 13, 2020; 6:00 pm	No. RV	at Coastal Carolina	L 103–124	19–4 (10–2)	HTC Center (747); Conway, SC
Feb 15, 2020; 2:00 pm	No. RV	at Appalachian State	W 81–61	20–4 (11–2)	Holmes Convocation Center (568); Boone, NC
Feb 20, 2020; 6:00 pm	No. RV	Little Rock	W 77–59	21–4 (12–2)	Trojan Arena (2,001); Troy, AL
Feb 22, 2020; 4:00 pm	No. RV	Arkansas State	W 79–64	22–4 (13–2)	Trojan Arena (2,120); Troy, AL
Feb 29, 2020; 4:00 pm	No. RV	at South Alabama	W 77–73	23–4 (14–2)	Mitchell Center; Mobile, AL
Mar 5, 2020; 6:30 pm	No. RV	at Little Rock	W 70–54	24–4 (15–2)	Jack Stephens Center (662); Little Rock, AR
Mar 7, 2020; 4:00 pm	No. RV	at Arkansas State	W 91–81	25–4 (16–2)	First National Bank Arena (791); Jonesboro, AR
Sun Belt Women's Tournament
Mar 14, 2020	(1) No. RV	vs. (4) Louisiana; Semifinals	Tournament canceled due to COVID-19 pandemic		Smoothie King Center; New Orleans, LA
*Non-conference game. ^{#}Rankings from AP Poll. (#) Tournament seedings in parentheses. All times are in Central Time.

== Rankings ==
2018–19 NCAA Division I women's basketball rankings

+ Regular season polls	Poll	Pre- Season	Week 2	Week 3	Week 4	Week 5	Week 6	Week 7	Week 8	Week 9	Week 10	Week 11	Week 12	Week 13	Week 14	Week 15	Week 16	Week 17	Week 18	Week 19	Final
AP																					
Coaches														RV	RV	RV	RV	RV	RV	RV	

Legend
	Increase in ranking
	Decrease in ranking
	No change
(RV)	Received votes
(NR)	Not ranked

== See also ==
- 2019–20 Troy Trojans men's basketball team
