= 2019–20 Louisiana–Monroe Warhawks women's basketball team =

Intercollegiate basketball season

2019–20 Louisiana–Monroe Warhawks women's basketball
- Conference: Sun Belt Conference
- Record: 3–26 (1–17 Sun Belt)
- Head coach: Brooks Donald-Williams (1st season)
- Assistant coaches: Christie Sides; Jessica Barber; Kendra Wells
- Home arena: Fant–Ewing Coliseum

2019–20 Sun Belt Conference women's basketball standings
	Conf.				Overall
Team	W		L	PCT	W		L	PCT
Troy*	16	–	2	.889	25	–	4	.862
Coastal Carolina	15	–	3	.833	25	–	4	.862
UT Arlington	14	–	4	.778	21	–	11	.656
Louisiana	10	–	8	.556	19	–	12	.613
South Alabama	9	–	9	.500	16	–	16	.500
Little Rock	9	–	9	.500	12	–	19	.387
Arkansas State	8	–	10	.444	12	–	18	.400
Appalachian State	8	–	10	.444	11	–	19	.367
Georgia Southern	7	–	11	.389	10	–	19	.345
Texas State	6	–	12	.333	13	–	17	.433
Georgia State	5	–	13	.278	8	–	21	.276
Louisiana–Monroe	1	–	17	.056	3	–	26	.103
† 2020 Sun Belt Tournament winner As of March 18, 2025; Rankings from AP poll

The 2019–20 Louisiana–Monroe Warhawks women's basketball team represented the University of Louisiana at Monroe in the 2019–20 NCAA Division I women's basketball season. The Warhawks, led by first year head coach Brooks Donald-Williams, played their home games at Fant–Ewing Coliseum and were members of the Sun Belt Conference. They finished the season 3–26, 1–17 in Sun Belt play to finish in dead-last twelfth place. They failed to qualify for the Sun Belt women's tournament.

This was Donald-Williams' first season at the helm of the Warhawks teams following the firing of Jeff Dow in March 2019. She came to Louisiana–Monroe after assistant stints at Alabama, Southern Miss, Memphis, and Arkansas–Little Rock and a nine-year stint at the helm of McNeese State's program including four 20+ win seasons, two conference tournament championships, and one regular season championship at McNeese.

== Preseason ==
=== Sun Belt coaches poll ===
On October 30, 2019, the Sun Belt released their preseason coaches poll with the Chanticleers predicted to finish in seventh place in the conference.

Predicted finish	Team	Votes (1st place)
1	Little Rock	127 (6)
2	Troy	123 (4)
3	UT Arlington	120 (1)
4	South Alabama	119 (1)
5	Appalachian State	100
6	Georgia State	73
7	Coastal Carolina	66
8	Louisiana	64
9	Texas State	59
10	Arkansas State	44
11	Georgia Southern	26
12	Louisiana–Monroe	15

=== Sun Belt Preseason All-Conference team ===
No Louisiana–Monroe members were chosen to the preseason team.

== Roster ==
2019–20 Louisiana–Monroe Warhawks women's basketball team
Players
Coaches

Pos.	#	Name	Height	Year	Previous school	Hometown
G	1	Amber Thompson	5 ft 9 in (1.75 m)	Sr	Dyer County HS; Walters State CC	Dyersburg, TN
G	2	Gara Beth Self	5 ft 8 in (1.73 m)	Fr	Ingomar HS	New Albany, MS
G	3	Linda Van Schiak	5 ft 10 in (1.78 m)	Fr	Orange Angels Academy	South Holland, Netherlands
F	4	Kierra Crockett	6 ft 0 in (1.83 m)	Jr	North Farmington HS; Independence CC	Farmington Hills, MI
G	10	Maddi Gatte	5 ft 9 in (1.75 m)	So	Iota HS; Southwest CC	Egan, LA
G/F	11	Whitney Goins	6 ft 0 in (1.83 m)	Jr	Anacoco HS	Anacoco, LA
G	13	Destini Lunsford	5 ft 7 in (1.7 m)	Sr	Corsicana HS	Corsicana, TX
G	22	Lauren Fitch	5 ft 6 in (1.68 m)	Sr	Austin HS; Itawamba CC	Decatur, AL
C	24	Diamond Brooks	6 ft 2 in (1.88 m)	Jr	Jewel M. Sumner HS	Kentwood, LA
F	35	Jamie Means	6 ft 1 in (1.85 m)	So	Denton HS	Little Elm, TX

Head coach

- Brooks Donald-Williams (Mississippi State)

Assistant coach(es)

- Christie Sides (Louisiana Tech)
- Jessica Barber (Mobile)
- Kendra Wells (McNeese State)

Legend

- (C) Team captain
- (S) Suspended
- (I) Ineligible
- (W) Walk-on
- Injured
- Current redshirt

Roster
Last update: 16 August 2020

== Schedule ==
Date time, TV	Rank^{#}	Opponent^{#}	Result	Record	High points	High rebounds	High assists	Site (attendance) city, state
Exhibition
Nov 4, 2019*; 11:00 am		Millsaps	W 64–56		19 – Brooks	8 – Goins	2 – Thompson	Fant–Ewing Coliseum; Monroe, LA
Non-conference regular season
Nov 10, 2019*; 2:00 pm		at Ole Miss	L 42–66	0–1	11 – Self	8 – Brooks	3 – Self	The Pavilion at Ole Miss (1,448); Oxford, MS
Nov 12, 2019*; 5:30 pm		at Tennessee Tech	L 68–75	0–2	28 – Fitch	8 – Fitch	2 – Goins	Eblen Center (883); Cookeville, TN
Nov 16, 2019*; 12:00 pm		Southern Miss	L 42–57	0–3	13 – Fitch	7 – Thompson	3 – Thompson	Fant–Ewing Coliseum (709); Monroe, LA
Nov 18, 2019*; 6:00 pm		Northwestern State	W 63–54	1–3	15 – Fitch	11 – Crockett	4 – Van Schaik	Fant–Ewing Coliseum (798); Monroe, LA
Nov 24, 2019*; 2:00 pm		Southeastern Louisiana	L 52–65	1–4	15 – Thompson	9 – Crockett	4 – Thompson	Fant–Ewing Coliseum (781); Monroe, LA
Dec 1, 2019*; 2:00 pm		at McNeese State	L 69–72	1–5	23 – Fitch	7 – Crockett	7 – Fitch	H&HP Complex (2,311); Lake Charles, LA
Dec 7, 2019*; 12:00 pm		Houston Baptist	L 65–72	1–6	13 – Fitch	7 – Coatney	5 – Fitch	Fant–Ewing Coliseum (681); Monroe, LA
Dec 10, 2019*; 6:00 pm		at Nicholls	L 59–74	1–7	12 – Van Schaik	6 – Thompson	4 – Fitch	Stopher Gymnasium (197); Thibodaux, LA
Exhibition
Dec 17, 2019*; 6:00 pm		Louisiana College	W 84–40		13 – Means	7 – Crockett	5 – Fitch	Fant–Ewing Coliseum (407); Monroe, LA
Non-conference regular season
Dec 20, 2019*; 7:00 pm		at North Texas	L 51–63	1–8	12 – Fitch	7 – Thompson	4 – Thompson	UNT Coliseum (1,068); Denton, TX
Dec 22, 2019*; 1:00 pm		at Texas Tech	L 38–83	1–9	8 – Thompson	8 – TEAM	3 – Self	United Supermarkets Arena (3,276); Lubbock, TX
Dec 29, 2019*; 2:00 pm		Mississippi Valley State	W 74–66	2–9	21 – Thompson	11 – Crockett	5 – Self	Fant–Ewing Coliseum (741); Monroe, LA
Sun Belt regular season
Jan 2, 2020; 5:30 pm		at Georgia Southern	L 47–64	2–10 (0–1)	18 – Thompson	10 – Crockett	4 – Self	Hanner Fieldhouse (323); Statesboro, GA
Jan 4, 2020; 11:00 am		at Georgia State	L 52–68	2–11 (0–2)	15 – Brooks	6 – Brooks	5 – Goins	GSU Sports Arena (465); Atlanta, GA
Jan 8, 2020; 6:00 pm		Troy	L 65–72	2–12 (0–3)	19 – Goinz	8 – Crockett	5 – Self	Fant–Ewing Coliseum (457); Monroe, LA
Jan 11, 2020; 4:00 pm		at South Alabama	L 63–72	2–13 (0–4)	18 – Thompson	13 – Crockett	2 – Thompson	Mitchell Center (330); Mobile, AL
Jan 16, 2020; 7:00 pm		at Texas State	W 58–55	3–13 (1–4)	20 – Self	9 – Brooks	5 – Self	Strahan Arena (904); San Marcos, TX
Jan 18, 2020; 2:00 pm		at UT Arlington	L 34–72	3–14 (1–5)	15 – Self	6 – Crockett	2 – Thompson	College Park Center (1,002); Arlington, TX
Jan 23, 2020; 6:00 pm		Little Rock	L 50–70	3–15 (1–6)	14 – Self	10 – Crockett	3 – Self	Fant–Ewing Coliseum (744); Monroe, LA
Jan 25, 2020; 2:00 pm		at Louisiana	L 55–68	3–16 (1–7)	13 – Goins	10 – Thompson	3 – Thompson	Cajundome (862); Lafayette, LA
Feb 1, 2020; 12:00 pm		Arkansas State	L 53–54	3–17 (1–8)	17 – Self	9 – Means	5 – Gatte	Fant–Ewing Coliseum (1,019); Monroe, LA
Feb 5, 2020; 6:00 pm		at Troy	L 65–77	3–18 (1–9)	20 – Thompson	11 – Crockett	3 – Thompson	Trojan Arena (1,648); Troy, AL
Feb 8, 2020; 12:00 pm		South Alabama	L 39–73	3–19 (1–10)	17 – Thompson	10 – Brooks	2 – Gatte	Fant–Ewing Coliseum (626); Monroe, LA
Feb 13, 2020; 6:00 pm		Georgia Southern	L 66–72	3–20 (1–11)	17 – Brooks	10 – Crockett	2 – Thompson	Fant–Ewing Coliseum (723); Monroe, LA
Feb 15, 2020; 12:00 pm		Georgia State	L 43–52	3–21 (1–12)	13 – Thompson	10 – Brooks	4 – Self	Fant–Ewing Coliseum (857); Monroe, LA
Feb 22, 2020; 12:00 pm		Louisiana	L 49–62	3–22 (1–13)	16 – Thompson	9 – Brooks	4 – Thompson	Fant–Ewing Coliseum; Monroe, LA
Feb 27, 2020; 5:00 pm		at Coastal Carolina	L 69–88	3–23 (1–14)	28 – Self	10 – Crockett	4 – Thompson	HTC Center (347); Conway, SC
Feb 29, 2020; 1:00 pm		at Appalachian State	L 49–68	3–24 (1–15)	13 – Thompson	6 – Crockett	3 – Thompson	Holmes Center (847); Boone, NC
Mar 5, 2020; 6:00 pm		Texas State	L 53–59	3–25 (1–16)	18 – Self	8 – Thompson	4 – Self	Fant–Ewing Coliseum (853); Monroe, LA
Mar 7, 2020; 12:00 pm		UT Arlington	L 67–74	3–26 (1–17)	19 – Self	7 – Brooks	4 – Thompson	Fant–Ewing Coliseum (990); Monroe, LA
*Non-conference game. ^{#}Rankings from AP Poll. (#) Tournament seedings in parentheses. All times are in Central Time.

== See also ==
2019–20 Louisiana–Monroe Warhawks men's basketball team
