= 2020 Sun Belt Conference men's basketball tournament =

- Classification: Division I
- Season: 2019–20
- Teams: 10
- Site: Campus sites (1st, 2nd, Qrts); Smoothie King Center (Semis, Championship); New Orleans, Louisiana
- Television: ESPN+, ESPN2

2019–20 Sun Belt Conference men's basketball standings
| | Conf. | | | | Overall |
| Team | W | | L | PCT | W | | L | PCT |
|---|---|---|---|---|---|---|---|---|
| Little Rock | 15 | – | 5 | .750 | 21 | – | 10 | .677 |
| South Alabama | 13 | – | 7 | .650 | 20 | – | 11 | .645 |
| Texas State | 13 | – | 7 | .650 | 21 | – | 11 | .656 |
| Georgia State | 12 | – | 8 | .600 | 19 | – | 13 | .594 |
| Georgia Southern | 12 | – | 8 | .600 | 20 | – | 13 | .606 |
| Appalachian State | 11 | – | 9 | .550 | 18 | – | 15 | .545 |
| UT Arlington | 10 | – | 10 | .500 | 14 | – | 18 | .438 |
| Louisiana | 8 | – | 12 | .400 | 14 | – | 19 | .424 |
| Arkansas State | 8 | – | 12 | .400 | 16 | – | 16 | .500 |
| Coastal Carolina | 8 | – | 12 | .400 | 16 | – | 17 | .485 |
| Louisiana–Monroe | 5 | – | 15 | .250 | 9 | – | 20 | .310 |
| Troy | 5 | – | 15 | .250 | 9 | – | 22 | .290 |
Note: The 2020 Sun Belt Tournament was canceled after the quarterfinals due to the COVID-19 pandemic.

The 2020 Sun Belt Conference men's basketball tournament was the postseason men's basketball tournament for Sun Belt Conference during the 2019–20 NCAA Division I men's basketball season. Tournament first round, second round, and quarterfinal games were played at the campus sites of the higher seeded team between March 7–11. The semifinals and championship game would have been held from March 14–15, 2020, in New Orleans, Louisiana, at the Smoothie King Center. The regular season champion would have received the Sun Belt's automatic bid to the 2020 NCAA tournament.

== Seeds ==
Only the top 10 of the 12 conference teams will qualify for the tournament. The No. 5 and No. 6 seeds will receive and first round bye, the No. 3 and No. 4 seeds receive a double bye to the quarterfinals, while the No. 1 and No. 2 seeded teams receive a triple bye to the semifinals. Teams are seeded by record within the conference, with a tiebreaker system to seed teams with identical conference records.

| Seed | School | Conference | Tiebreaker |
|---|---|---|---|
| 1 | Little Rock | 15–5 | |
| 2 | South Alabama | 13–7 | 1–0 vs. Texas State |
| 3 | Texas State | 13–7 | 0–1 vs. South Alabama |
| 4 | Georgia State | 12–8 | 1–0 vs. Little Rock |
| 5 | Georgia Southern | 12–8 | 0–1 vs. Little Rock |
| 6 | Appalachian State | 11–9 | |
| 7 | UT Arlington | 10–10 | |
| 8 | Louisiana | 8–12 | 2–1 vs. Arkansas State/Coastal Carolina |
| 9 | Arkansas State | 8–12 | 2–2 vs. Georgia State/Georgia Southern |
| 10 | Coastal Carolina | 8–12 | 1–3 vs. Georgia State/Georgia Southern |

== Schedule ==
| Game | Time | Matchup | Score | Television |
First round – Saturday, March 7, 2020 – campus sites
| 1 | 11:00 am | No. 9 Arkansas State at No. 8 Louisiana | 66–73 | ESPN+ |
| 2 | 2:00 pm | No. 10 Coastal Carolina at No. 7 UT Arlington | 63-62 | ESPN+ |
Second round – Monday, March 9, 2020 – campus sites
| 3 | 6:00 pm | No. 8 Louisiana at No. 5 Georgia Southern | 81–82 | ESPN+ |
| 4 | 6:00 pm | No. 10 Coastal Carolina at No. 6 Appalachian State | 65–70 | ESPN+ |
Quarterfinals – Wednesday, March 11, 2020 – campus sites
| 5 | 6:00 pm | No. 5 Georgia Southern at No. 4 Georgia State | 81-62 | ESPN+ |
| 6 | 7:00 pm | No. 6 Appalachian State at No. 3 Texas State | 68-85 | ESPN+ |
Semifinals – Saturday, March 14, 2020 – Smoothie King Center, New Orleans, LA
| 7 | CCD | No. 1 Little Rock vs. No. 5 Georgia Southern | | ESPN+ |
| 8 | CCD | No. 2 South Alabama vs. No. 3 Texas State | | ESPN+ |
Championship – Sunday, March 15, 2020 – Smoothie King Center, New Orleans, LA
| 9 | CCD | Game 7 winner vs. Game 8 winner | | ESPN2 |
Game times are in Central Time. Rankings denote tournament seed.

== Bracket ==
First round Saturday, March 7
8 | Louisiana | 73
9 | Arkansas State | 66
7 | UT Arlington | 62
10 | Coastal Carolina | 63

Second round Monday, March 9
5 | Georgia Southern | 82
8 | Louisiana | 81
6 | Appalachian State | 70
10 | Coastal Carolina | 65

Quarterfinals; Wednesday, March 11
4 | Georgia State | 62
5 | Georgia Southern | 81
3 | Texas State | 85
6 | Appalachian State | 68

Semifinals; Saturday, March 14
1 | Little Rock
5 | Georgia Southern
2 | South Alabama
3 | Texas State

Championship; Sunday, March 15

== See also ==
2020 Sun Belt Conference women's basketball tournament
