= 2019–20 Louisiana Ragin' Cajuns women's basketball team =

Intercollegiate basketball season

2019–20 Louisiana Ragin' Cajuns women's basketball
- Conference: Sun Belt Conference
- Record: 19–12 (10–8 Sun Belt)
- Head coach: Garry Brodhead (8th season)
- Assistant coaches: Deacon Jones; Amber Gregg; Valerie Huizar
- Home arena: Cajundome

2019–20 Sun Belt Conference women's basketball standings
	Conf.				Overall
Team	W		L	PCT	W		L	PCT
Troy*	16	–	2	.889	25	–	4	.862
Coastal Carolina	15	–	3	.833	25	–	4	.862
UT Arlington	14	–	4	.778	21	–	11	.656
Louisiana	10	–	8	.556	19	–	12	.613
South Alabama	9	–	9	.500	16	–	16	.500
Little Rock	9	–	9	.500	12	–	19	.387
Arkansas State	8	–	10	.444	12	–	18	.400
Appalachian State	8	–	10	.444	11	–	19	.367
Georgia Southern	7	–	11	.389	10	–	19	.345
Texas State	6	–	12	.333	13	–	17	.433
Georgia State	5	–	13	.278	8	–	21	.276
Louisiana–Monroe	1	–	17	.056	3	–	26	.103
† 2020 Sun Belt tournament winner

The 2019–20 Louisiana Ragin' Cajuns women's basketball team represented the University of Louisiana at Lafayette during the 2019–20 NCAA Division I women's basketball season. The Ragin' Cajuns were led by eighth-year head coach Garry Brodhead and played all home games at the Cajundome along with the Louisiana Ragin' Cajuns men's basketball team with the exception of their March 5 meeting with UT Arlington at Earl K. Long Gymnasium, the first basketball game to be held there since 2016. They are members in the Sun Belt Conference.

On March 12, the Sun Belt Conference cancelled the remainder of their women's and men's basketball tournaments due to rising threats of the COVID-19 pandemic. The Cajuns were scheduled to play Troy in the upcoming weekend. The Cajuns will finish the season ranked number four in the conference.

== Previous season ==
The Ragin' Cajuns finished the 2017–18 season 7-23, 5–13 in Sun Belt play to finish in tenth place in the conference. They made it to the 2018-19 Sun Belt Conference women's basketball tournament before losing to the South Alabama Jaguars 61–73 in the first-round game. The Ragin' Cajuns did not participate in any other post-season play.

== Roster ==
2019–20 Louisiana Ragin' Cajuns women's basketball team
Players
Coaches

Pos.	#	Name	Height	Year	Previous school	Hometown
G	0	Alexandria Goodly	5 ft 5 in (1.65 m)	Fr	St. Louis Catholic HS	Lake Charles, LA
F	1	Kimberly Burton	5 ft 11 in (1.8 m)	Jr	Red River HS	Shreveport, LA
G	2	Brandi Williams	5 ft 6 in (1.68 m)	So	Barbe HS	Lake Charles, LA
G	3	Jasmine Thomas	5 ft 7 in (1.7 m)	Jr	North Caddo HS	Vivian, LA
G/F	4	Jomyra Mathis	5 ft 8 in (1.73 m)	Jr	Landry Walker HS	New Orleans, LA
G	5	Makayia Hallmon	5 ft 3 in (1.6 m)	Fr	Red River HS	Coushatta, LA
G	10	Andrea Cournoyer	5 ft 4 in (1.63 m)	So	Merryville HS	Merryville, LA
G/F	11	Skyler Goodwin	5 ft 8 in (1.73 m)	Jr	Parkview Baptist HS	Baton Rouge, LA
G	15	Diamond Morrison	5 ft 4 in (1.63 m)	So	East View HS	Georgetown, TX
F	20	Caira Wren	5 ft 10 in (1.78 m)	Fr	McKinley Senior HS	Baton Rouge, LA
F	21	Bre'Yelle Porter	6 ft 2 in (1.88 m)	Fr	Lafayette Christian Academy	Lafayette, LA
F	22	Kendall Bess	6 ft 1 in (1.85 m)	Sr	Tyler Junior College, Morehead State	Richmond, TX
F	23	Kristen Daniels	5 ft 11 in (1.8 m)	RS So	Barbe HS; McNeese State	Lake Charles, LA
G/F	25	Jazmyn Womack	5 ft 11 in (1.8 m)	So	Ponchatoula HS	Ponchatoula, LA
F	35	Ty'Reona Doucet	6 ft 1 in (1.85 m)	Jr	Ville Platte HS	Ville Platte, LA

Head coach

- Garry Boadhead (Louisiana)

Assistant coach(es)

- Deacon Jones (Louisiana)
- Amber Gregg (Texas–San Antonio)
- Valerie Huizar (LSU–Shreveport)

Legend

- (C) Team captain
- (S) Suspended
- (I) Ineligible
- (W) Walk-on
- Injured
- Current redshirt

Roster
Last update: November 10, 2019

== Schedule and results ==
Date time, TV	Rank^{#}	Opponent^{#}	Result	Record	High points	High rebounds	High assists	Site city, state
Exhibition
10/28/2019*; 6:00 pm		Mississippi College	W 73–65		19 – Cournoyer	8 – Burton	3 – Morrison	Cajundome (370); Lafayette, LA
11/01/2019*; 6:00 pm		Spring Hill College	W 85–48		12 – Tied	7 – Burton	3 – Tied	Cajundome (169); Lafayette, LA
Non-conference regular season
11/07/2019*; 6:00 pm, ESPN+/CST		Loyola (LA)	W 67–51	1–0	12 – Goodwin	4 – Bess	3 – Wren	Cajundome (623); Lafayette, LA
11/10/2019*; 3:00 pm		at Sam Houston State	L 73–77	1–1	18 – Tied	14 – Doucet	4 – Cournoyer	Bernard Johnson Coliseum (529); Huntsville, TX
11/14/2018*; 6:00 pm, ESPN+		McNeese State; Faculty/Staff Appreciation	W 75-55	2-1	14 – Tied	7 – Tied	5 – Thomas	Cajundome (883); Lafayette, LA
11/17/2019*; 4:00 pm, ESPN+		Southeastern Louisiana; Fansgiving	W 60-50	3-1	25 – Williams	9 – Williams	2 – Cournoyer	Cajundome (831); Lafayette, LA
11/21/2019*; 7:00 pm		at New Orleans	W 65-60	4-1	21 – Tied	12 – Doucet	3 – Cournoyer	Lakefront Arena (321); New Orleans, LA
11/25/2019*; 7:00 pm, ESPN+		at Lamar	W 74-63	5-1	14 – Williams	11 – Doucet	2 – Tied	Montagne Center (912); Beaumont, TX
12/02/2019*; 6:00 pm, ESPN+/CST		Xavier (LA); Christmas at the Cajundome	W 62-49	6-1	10 – Tied	7 – Daniels	2 – Tied	Cajundome (779); Lafayette, LA
12/07/2019*; 2:00 pm		at North Texas	L 66-69	6-2	18 – Williams	7 – Williams	2 – Tied	UNT Coliseum (1,327); Denton, TX
12/16/2019*; 11:00 am, ESPN+/CST		No. 15 Mississippi State; Education Day	L 48-64	6-3	10 – Burton	5 – Doucet	3 – Mathis	Cajundome (3,187); Lafayette, LA
12/20/2019*; 7:00 pm		at Ole Miss	W 53-42	7-3	16 – Doucet	9 – Williams	7 – Thomas	The Pavilion at Ole Miss (1,123); Oxford, MS
12/29/2019*; 3:00 pm		at Jackson State	L 54–65	7–4	13 – Williams	8 – Daniels	3 – Goodly	Williams Assembly Center (125); Jackson, MS
Conference regular season
01/02/2020; 5:00 pm		at Georgia State	W 75–65	8–4 (1–0)	14 – Mathis	8 – Mathis	5 – Tied	GSU Sports Arena (408); Atlanta, GA
01/04/2020; 1:00 pm		at Georgia Southern	L 67–83	8-5 (1-1)	17 – Doucet	6 – Doucet	3 – Tied	Hanner Fieldhouse (447); Statesboro, GA
01/09/2020; 6:00 pm, ESPN+		South Alabama; Rally Program Appreciation	W 73-68	9-5 (2-1)	17 – Goodwin	18 – Doucet	4 – Doucet	Cajundome (824); Lafayette, LA
01/11/2020; 2:00 pm, ESPN+		at Troy	W 79-73	10-5 (3-1)	17 – Doucet	8 – Doucet	8 – Cournoyer	Trojan Arena (1,242); Troy, AL
01/16/2020; 11:30 am, ESPN+		at UT Arlington	L 53-79	10-6 (3-2)	13 – Williams	6 – Mathis	2 – Mathis	College Park Center (5,714); Arlington, TX
01/18/2020; 2:00 pm, ESPN+		at Texas State	W 73-67	11-6 (4-2)	22 – Doucet	7 – Doucet	5 – Cournoyer	Strahan Arena (1,132); San Marcos, TX
01/23/2020; 6:00 pm, ESPN+		Arkansas State; Young Ragin' Cajuns Club Day/Kid's Day	W 83-48	12-6 (5-2)	12 – Hallmon	6 – Daniels	6 – Cournoyer	Cajundome (801); Lafayette, LA
01/25/2020; 2:00 pm, ESPN+		Louisiana−Monroe; Alumni Night	W 68-55	13-6 (6-2)	17 – Doucet	11 – Doucet	4 – Cournoyer	Cajundome (862); Lafayette, LA
02/01/2020; 2:00 pm, ESPN+		Little Rock; National Girls and Women in Sports Day	L 44-59	13-7 (6-3)	9 – Cournoyer	9 – Doucet	1 – Burton	Cajundome (868); Lafayette, LA
02/06/2020; 7:00 pm, ESPN+		at South Alabama	L 63-78	13-8 (6-4)	19 – Doucet	9 – Doucet	4 – Cournoyer	Mitchell Center (345); Mobile, AL
02/08/2020; 2:00 pm, ESPN+		Troy; Girl Scouts Day	L 64-67	13-9 (6-5)	16 – Cournoyer	7 – Goodwin	4 – Goodwin	Cajundome (892); Lafayette, LA
02/13/2020; 6:00 pm, ESPN+		Georgia State; Superhero Night/Hoops for Troops	L 53-61	13-10 (6-6)	12 – Mathis	7 – Tied	3 – Williams	Cajundome (803); Lafayette, LA
02/15/2020; 2:00 pm		Georgia Southern; Pink Out Game	W 72-60	14-10 (7-6)	18 – Mathis	11 – Goodwin	2 – Doucet	Cajundome (801); Lafayette, LA
02/22/2020; 12:00 pm, ESPN+		at Louisiana–Monroe	W 62-49	15-10 (8-6)	19 – Burton	7 – Doucet	4 – Thompson	Fant–Ewing Coliseum; Monroe, LA
02/27/2020; 5:30 pm, ESPN+		at Appalachian State	W 57-51	16-10 (9-6)	18 – Doucet	11 – Burton	3 – Mathis	George M. Holmes Convocation Center (803); Boone, NC
02/29/2020; 1:00 pm, ESPN+		at Coastal Carolina	L 74-83	16-11 (9-7)	19 – Williams	10 – Mathis	8 – Mathis	HTC Center (317); Conway, SC
03/05/2020; 6:00 pm		UT Arlington; Greek Night	L 66-73	16-12 (9-8)	13 – Goodwin	7 – Tied	2 – Thomas	Earl K. Long Gymnasium (843); Lafayette, LA
03/07/2020; 2:00 pm, ESPN+		Texas State; Senior Day	W 70-64	17-12 (10-8)	17 – Goodwin	9 – Doucet	2 – Thomas	Cajundome (1,261); Lafayette, LA
Sun Belt Tournament
03/10/2020; 2:00 pm, ESPN+	(4)	vs. (9) Georgia Southern; First Round	W 81-64	18-12	18 – Mathis	12 – Doucet	4 – Goodwin	Cajundome (300); Lafayette, LA
03/11/2020; 7:00 pm, ESPN+	(4)	vs. (5) Little Rock; Quarterfinals	W 49-46	19-12	24 – Doucet	9 – Thomas	1 – Thomas	Cajundome (369); Lafayette, LA
03/14/2020; 5:00 pm, ESPN+	(4)	vs. (1) Troy; Semifinals	Cancelled because of COVID-19 pandemic SBC Tournament					Smoothie King Center; New Orleans, LA
*Non-conference game. ^{#}Rankings from AP Poll. (#) Tournament seedings in parentheses. All times are in Central Time.

== See also ==
- 2019–20 Louisiana Ragin' Cajuns men's basketball team
