= 2019–20 Little Rock Trojans men's basketball team =

American college basketball season

2019–20 Little Rock Trojans men's basketball
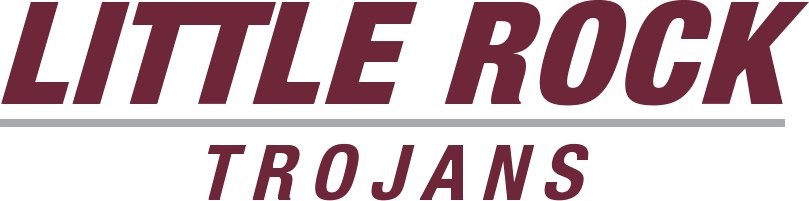

Sun Belt regular season champions
- Conference: Sun Belt Conference
- Record: 21–10 (15–5 Sun Belt)
- Head coach: Darrell Walker (2nd season)
- Assistant coaches: Charles Baker; Alfred Jordan; Preston Laird
- Home arena: Jack Stephens Center

2019–20 Sun Belt Conference men's basketball standings
	Conf.				Overall
Team	W		L	PCT	W		L	PCT
Little Rock	15	–	5	.750	21	–	10	.677
South Alabama	13	–	7	.650	20	–	11	.645
Texas State	13	–	7	.650	21	–	11	.656
Georgia State	12	–	8	.600	19	–	13	.594
Georgia Southern	12	–	8	.600	20	–	13	.606
Appalachian State	11	–	9	.550	18	–	15	.545
UT Arlington	10	–	10	.500	14	–	18	.438
Louisiana	8	–	12	.400	14	–	19	.424
Arkansas State	8	–	12	.400	16	–	16	.500
Coastal Carolina	8	–	12	.400	16	–	17	.485
Louisiana–Monroe	5	–	15	.250	9	–	20	.310
Troy	5	–	15	.250	9	–	22	.290
Note: The 2020 Sun Belt Tournament was canceled after the quarterfinals due to the COVID-19 pandemic.

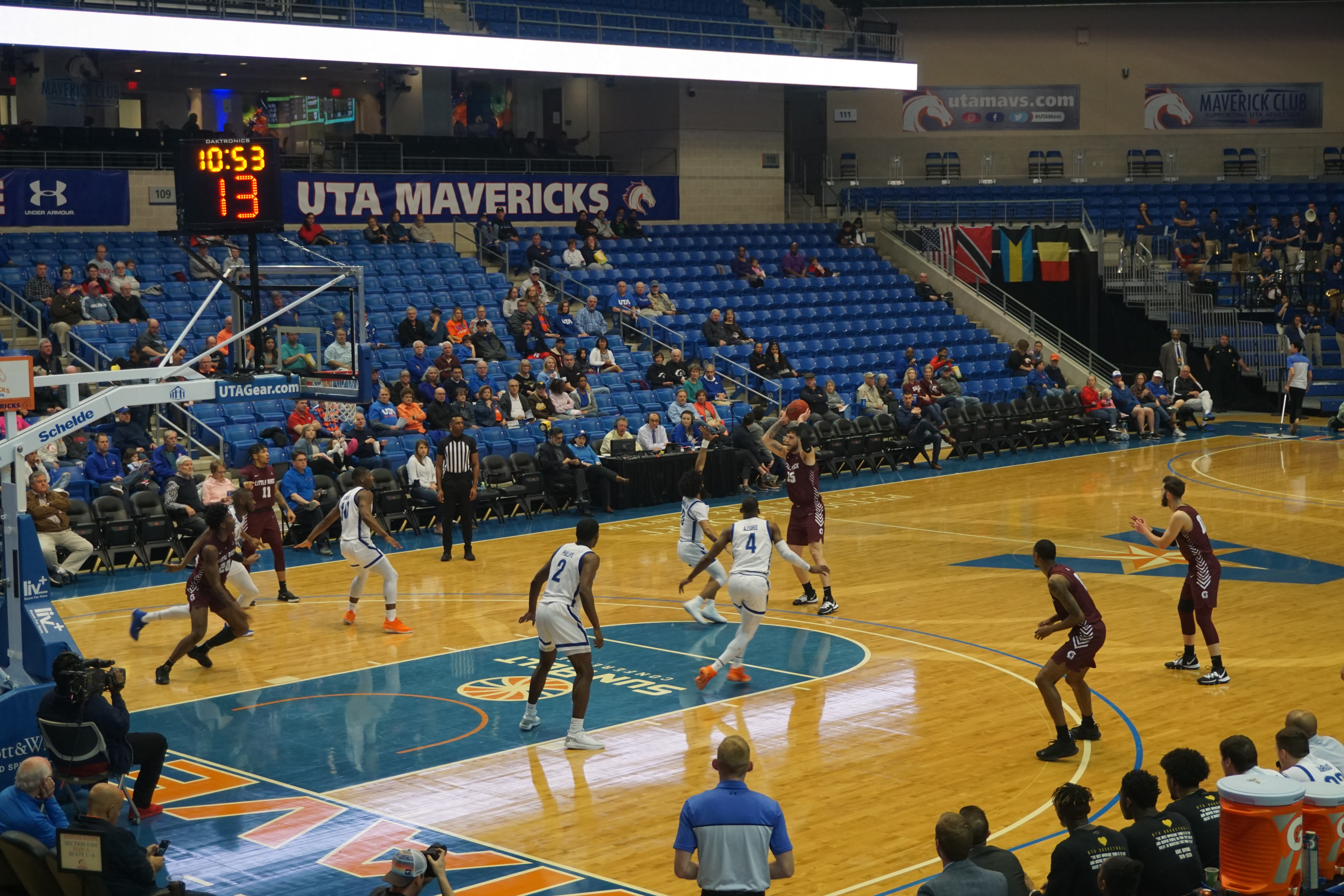
The Trojans in action against the UT Arlington Mavericks

The 2019–20 Little Rock Trojans men's basketball team represented the University of Arkansas at Little Rock in the 2019–20 NCAA Division I men's basketball season. The Trojans, were led by 2nd-year head coach Darrell Walker, play their home games at the Jack Stephens Center in Little Rock, Arkansas as members of the Sun Belt Conference. They finished the season 21–10, 15–5 in Sun Belt play to win the Sun Belt regular season championship. They were the No. 1 seed in the Sun Belt tournament, however, the tournament was cancelled amid the COVID-19 pandemic. Due to the Sun Belt Tournament cancellation, they were awarded the Sun Belt's automatic bid to the NCAA tournament. However, the NCAA Tournament was also cancelled due to the same outbreak.

== Previous season ==
The Trojans finished the 2018–19 season 10–21, 5–13 in Sun Belt play to finish in a tie for last place. They failed to qualify for the Sun Belt tournament.

== Roster ==
2019–20 Little Rock Trojans men's basketball team
Players
Coaches

Pos.	#	Name	Height	Weight	Year	Hometown
G	0	Ben Coupet Jr.	6 ft 7 in (2.01 m)	185 lb (84 kg)	RS Jr	Chicago, Illinois
G	1	Markquis Nowell	5 ft 7 in (1.7 m)	155 lb (70 kg)	So	Harlem, New York
G	2	Alsean Evans	6 ft 6 in (1.98 m)	195 lb (88 kg)	Jr	Lakeland, Florida
G	3	Isaiah Palermo	6 ft 5 in (1.96 m)	185 lb (84 kg)	Fr	Kissimmee, Florida
G	5	Sydney Agudah	6 ft 2 in (1.88 m)	175 lb (79 kg)	Jr	Fort Worth, Texas
G	10	Marko Lukic	6 ft 7 in (2.01 m)	195 lb (88 kg)	Fr	Belgrade, Serbia
G	11	Jaizec Lottie	6 ft 1 in (1.85 m)	180 lb (82 kg)	Jr	Aurora, Colorado
G	12	Terrell Curtis II	5 ft 10 in (1.78 m)	165 lb (75 kg)	So	Maumelle, Arkansas
C	13	Sam Dunkum	6 ft 11 in (2.11 m)	260 lb (118 kg)	RS Sr	North Little Rock, Arkansas
F	15	Horace Wyatt Jr.	6 ft 6 in (1.98 m)	180 lb (82 kg)	So	Atlanta, Georgia
F	20	Kamani Johnson	6 ft 7 in (2.01 m)	215 lb (98 kg)	So	Brooklyn, New York
G	21	Ryan Pippins	6 ft 0 in (1.83 m)	250 lb (113 kg)	Sr	Little Rock, Arkansas
F	25	Nikola Marić	6 ft 10 in (2.08 m)	250 lb (113 kg)	So	Trebinje, Bosnia and Herzegovina
F	32	Kris Bankston	6 ft 8 in (2.03 m)	220 lb (100 kg)	Jr	DeWitt, Arkansas
G	33	Jovan Stulic	6 ft 5 in (1.96 m)	205 lb (93 kg)	Fr	Prigrevica, Serbia
F	44	Ruot Monyyong	6 ft 10 in (2.08 m)	190 lb (86 kg)	Jr	Nashville, Tennessee
C	52	Admir Besovic	7 ft 0 in (2.13 m)	240 lb (109 kg)	Jr	Sarajevo, Bosnia and Herzegovina

Head coach

- Darrell Walker (Arkansas)

Assistant coach(es)

- Charles Baker (Eastern Kentucky)
- Alfred Jordan (Clark Atlanta)
- Preston Laird (Memphis)

Legend

- (C) Team captain
- (S) Suspended
- (I) Ineligible
- (W) Walk-on
- Injured
- Current redshirt

Roster
Last update: December 23, 2019

== Schedule and results ==
Date time, TV	Rank^{#}	Opponent^{#}	Result	Record	Site (attendance) city, state
Exhibition
October 20, 2019*; 3:00 pm, SECN+		at Arkansas; Charity Exhibition	L 64–79		Bud Walton Arena (7,384); Fayetteville, AR
Non-conference regular season
November 5, 2019*; 7:00 pm, ESPN3		at Missouri State	W 67–66	1–0	JQH Arena (5,002); Springfield, MO
November 10, 2019*; 3:00 pm, ESPN3		at Illinois State	L 70–75	1–1	Redbird Arena (3,988); Normal, IL
November 14, 2019*; 6:30 pm, ESPN+		Southwest Baptist	W 77–59	2–1	Jack Stephens Center (1,093); Little Rock, AR
November 17, 2019*; 2:00 pm		at Central Arkansas; Governor's I-40 Showdown	W 76–56	3–1	Farris Center (1,709); Conway, AR
November 20, 2019*; 7:00 pm, ESPN3		at No. 16 Memphis; Barclays Center Classic	L 58–68	3–2	FedExForum (15,390); Memphis, TN
November 23, 2019*; 12:00 pm, ACCN+		at NC State; Barclays Center Classic	L 58–74	3–3	PNC Arena (14,078); Raleigh, NC
November 26, 2019*; 6:30 pm		St. Francis Brooklyn; Barclays Center Classic	W 67–56	4–3	Jack Stephens Center (783); Little Rock, AR
November 27, 2019*; 6:30 pm		Alcorn State; Barclays Center Classic	W 67–50	5–3	Jack Stephens Center (807); Little Rock, AR
November 30, 2019*; 2:00 pm, ESPN+		East Tennessee State	L 63–67	5–4	Jack Stephens Center (921); Little Rock, AR
December 7, 2019*; 5:00 pm		at North Texas	L 53–76	5–5	The Super Pit (2,136); Denton, TX
December 10, 2019*; 6:30 pm, ESPN+		Tennessee State	W 86–62	6–5	Jack Stephens Center (1,080); Little Rock, AR
Sun Belt Conference regular season
December 19, 2019; 7:00 pm, ESPN+		at Louisiana–Monroe	W 73–72	7–5 (1–0)	Fant–Ewing Coliseum (1,862); Monroe, LA
December 21, 2019; 7:00 pm, ESPN+		at Louisiana	W 69–66	8–5 (2–0)	Cajundome (3,469); Lafayette, LA
January 2, 2020; 6:30 pm, ESPN+		Texas State	W 72–68	9–5 (3–0)	Jack Stephens Center (1,082); Little Rock, AR
January 4, 2020; 2:00 pm, ESPN+		UT Arlington	W 92–89	10–5 (4–0)	Jack Stephens Center (1,203); Little Rock, AR
January 6, 2020; 6:30 pm, ESPN+		Georgia Southern	W 79–73	11–5 (5–0)	Jack Stephens Center (1,188); Little Rock, AR
January 9, 2020; 6:00 pm, ESPN+		at Troy	L 71–76	11–6 (5–1)	Trojan Arena (2,815); Troy, AL
January 11, 2020; 4:30 pm, ESPN+		South Alabama	L 43–52	11–7 (5–2)	Jack Stephens Center (2,525); Little Rock, AR
January 16, 2020; 6:00 pm, ESPN+		at Coastal Carolina	W 71–55	12–7 (6–2)	HTC Center (1,521); Conway, SC
January 18, 2020; 3:00 pm, ESPN+		at Appalachian State	W 73–57	13–7 (7–2)	Holmes Center (2,753); Boone, NC
January 22, 2020; 6:30 pm, ESPN+		Troy	W 81–63	14–7 (8–2)	Jack Stephens Center (1,051); Little Rock, AR
January 25, 2020; 3:00 pm, ESPN+		at South Alabama	W 73–71	15–7 (9–2)	Mitchell Center (1,934); Mobile, AL
January 30, 2020; 6:30 pm, ESPN+		Coastal Carolina	W 96–79	16–7 (10–2)	Jack Stephens Center (1,562); Little Rock, AR
February 1, 2020; 2:00 pm, ESPN+		Appalachian State	W 93–86	17–7 (11–2)	Jack Stephens Center (1,745); Little Rock, AR
February 8, 2020; 2:00 pm, ESPN+		Arkansas State	W 90–87	18–7 (12–2)	Jack Stephens Center (3,522); Little Rock, AR
February 13, 2020; 7:00 pm, ESPN+		at Texas State	L 66–74	18–8 (12–3)	Strahan Arena (1,543); San Marcos, TX
February 15, 2020; 2:00 pm, ESPN+		at UT Arlington	L 65–76	18–9 (12–4)	College Park Center (1,340); Arlington, TX
February 22, 2020; 4:00 pm, ESPN+		at Arkansas State	W 81–78	19–9 (13–4)	First National Bank Arena (2,815); Jonesboro, AR
February 27, 2020; 6:30 pm, ESPN+		Louisiana–Monroe	W 79–63	20–9 (14–4)	Jack Stephens Center (2,126); Little Rock, AR
February 29, 2020; 2:00 pm, ESPN+		Louisiana	W 91–69	21–9 (15–4)	Jack Stephens Center (2,705); Little Rock, AR
March 3, 2020; 6:00 pm, ESPN+		at Georgia State	L 70–89	21–10 (15–5)	GSU Sports Arena (1,855); Atlanta, GA
Sun Belt tournament
Mar 14, 2020; 11:30 am, ESPN+	(1)	vs. (5) Georgia Southern; Semifinals	Cancelled due to the COVID-19 pandemic		Smoothie King Center; New Orleans, LA
*Non-conference game. ^{#}Rankings from AP Poll. (#) Tournament seedings in parentheses. All times are in Central.
