= 2019–20 UT Arlington Mavericks men's basketball team =

American college basketball season

2019–20 UT Arlington Mavericks men's basketball
- Conference: Sun Belt Conference
- Record: 14–18 (10–10 Sun Belt)
- Head coach: Chris Ogden (2nd season)
- Associate head coach: Greg Young
- Assistant coaches: Riley Davis; Royce Johnson
- Home arena: College Park Center

2019–20 Sun Belt Conference men's basketball standings
	Conf.				Overall
Team	W		L	PCT	W		L	PCT
Little Rock	15	–	5	.750	21	–	10	.677
South Alabama	13	–	7	.650	20	–	11	.645
Texas State	13	–	7	.650	21	–	11	.656
Georgia State	12	–	8	.600	19	–	13	.594
Georgia Southern	12	–	8	.600	20	–	13	.606
Appalachian State	11	–	9	.550	18	–	15	.545
UT Arlington	10	–	10	.500	14	–	18	.438
Louisiana	8	–	12	.400	14	–	19	.424
Arkansas State	8	–	12	.400	16	–	16	.500
Coastal Carolina	8	–	12	.400	16	–	17	.485
Louisiana–Monroe	5	–	15	.250	9	–	20	.310
Troy	5	–	15	.250	9	–	22	.290
Note: The 2020 Sun Belt Tournament was canceled after the quarterfinals due to the COVID-19 pandemic.

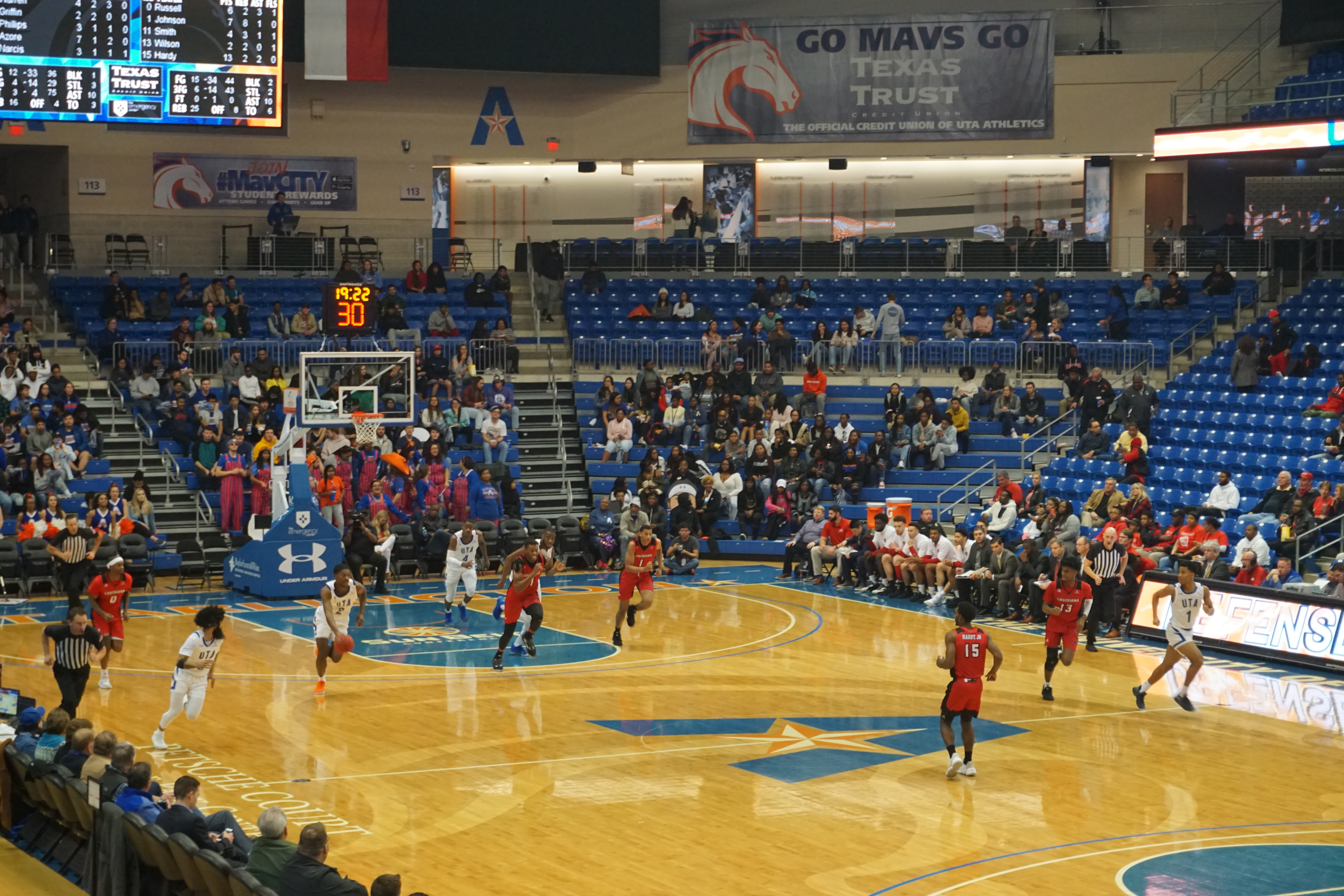
The Mavericks in action against the Louisiana Ragin' Cajuns

The 2019–20 UT Arlington Mavericks men's basketball team represented the University of Texas at Arlington in the 2019–20 NCAA Division I men's basketball season. The Mavericks, led by second-year head coach Chris Ogden, played their home games at the College Park Center in Arlington, Texas as members of the Sun Belt Conference. They finished the season 14–18, 10–10 in Sun Belt play, to finish seventh place. They lost in the first round of the Sun Belt tournament to Coastal Carolina.

== Previous season ==
The Mavericks finished the 2018–19 season 17–16, 12–6 in Sun Belt play, to finish in a tie for 2nd place. In the Sun Belt tournament, they defeated Georgia Southern in the semifinals, advancing to the championship game, where they were defeated by Georgia State.

== Roster ==
2019–20 UT Arlington Mavericks men's basketball team
Players
Coaches

Pos.	#	Name	Height	Weight	Year	Hometown
G	0	Brian Warren	5 ft 9 in (1.75 m)	170 lb (77 kg)	Sr	Indianapolis, IN
G	1	Sam Griffin	6 ft 3 in (1.91 m)	175 lb (79 kg)	Fr	Miami, FL
F	2	Jordan Phillips	6 ft 7 in (2.01 m)	215 lb (98 kg)	So	Fort Worth, TX
G/F	3	Ayoub Nouhi	6 ft 6 in (1.98 m)	205 lb (93 kg)	So	Brussels, Belgium
G	4	David Azore	6 ft 4 in (1.93 m)	205 lb (93 kg)	RS So	Houston, TX
F	10	Radshad Davis	6 ft 2 in (1.88 m)	205 lb (93 kg)	Sr	Nassau, Bahamas
G	11	Hunter Lavelle	6 ft 1 in (1.85 m)	165 lb (75 kg)	Fr	Argyle, TX
F	13	Jabari Narcis	6 ft 9 in (2.06 m)	240 lb (109 kg)	Sr	Chaguanas, Trinidad and Tobago
G	14	Davis Steelman	6 ft 3 in (1.91 m)	185 lb (84 kg)	Jr	Bedford, TX
G	20	Nicolas Elame	6 ft 3 in (1.91 m)	185 lb (84 kg)	Fr	Paris, France
F	21	Tre Jones	6 ft 5 in (1.96 m)	195 lb (88 kg)	Fr	Arlington, TX
F	22	TiAndre Jackson-Young	6 ft 4 in (1.93 m)	200 lb (91 kg)	Sr	Marshall, TX
F	23	Patrick Mwamba	6 ft 6 in (1.98 m)	196 lb (89 kg)	So	Bukavu, DR Congo
G	33	McKade Marquis	6 ft 0 in (1.83 m)	195 lb (88 kg)	RS Fr	Whitehouse, TX
F	43	Coleman Sparling	6 ft 7 in (2.01 m)	215 lb (98 kg)	RS Jr	Ellensburg, WA
F		Grayson Carter (redshirt)	6 ft 9 in (2.06 m)	225 lb (102 kg)	RS Fr	Dallas, TX

Head coach

- Chris Ogden (Texas)

Assistant coach(es)

- Greg Young (Howard Payne)
- Riley Davis (Howard)
- Royce Johnson (Thomas Edison State)

Legend

- (C) Team captain
- (S) Suspended
- (I) Ineligible
- (W) Walk-on
- Injured
- Current redshirt

Roster
Last update: September 25, 2024

== Schedule and results ==
Date time, TV	Rank^{#}	Opponent^{#}	Result	Record	Site (attendance) city, state
Non-conference regular season
November 5, 2019*; 7:00 p.m., ESPN+		UT Dallas	W 84–50	1–0	College Park Center (1,727); Arlington, TX
November 9, 2019*; 7:00 p.m., ESPN+		Tulsa	W 73–59	2–0	College Park Center (3,722); Arlington, TX
November 12, 2019*; 9:00 p.m.		at Nevada	L 73–80	2–1	Lawlor Events Center (7,504); Reno, NV
November 17, 2019*; 7:00 p.m., P12N		at No. 14 Oregon; Battle 4 Atlantis (Mainland)	L 47–67	2–2	Matthew Knight Arena (6,017); Eugene, OR
November 26, 2019*; 8:00 p.m.		at No. 8 Gonzaga; Battle 4 Atlantis (Mainland)	L 66–72	2–3	McCarthey Athletic Center (6,000); Spokane, WA
November 24, 2019*; 1:00 p.m., ESPN+		Arkansas Tech	W 85–68	3–3	College Park Center (1,157); Arlington, TX
November 27, 2019*; 2:00 p.m.		vs. Furman; Battle 4 Atlantis (Mainland)	L 57–58	3–4	Schar Center; Elon, NC
December 14, 2019*; 11:00 a.m.		at Elon; Battle 4 Atlantis (Mainland)	W 77–67	4–4	Schar Center (875); Elon, NC
December 2, 2019*; 7:00 p.m., ESPN+		North Texas	L 66–77	4–5	College Park Center (1,764); Arlington, TX
December 7, 2019*; 2:00 p.m., ESPN+		UC Santa Barbara	L 68–72	4–6	College Park Center (1,392); Arlington, TX
December 11, 2019*; 7:00 p.m., ESPN3		at Houston	L 63–71	4–7	Fertitta Center (6,657); Houston, TX
Sun Belt Conference regular season
December 19, 2019; 6:00 p.m., ESPN+		at Georgia State	L 77–83	4–8 (0–1)	GSU Sports Arena (1,057); Atlanta, GA
December 21, 2019; 12:00 p.m., ESPN+		at Georgia Southern	L 74–77	4–9 (0–2)	Hanner Fieldhouse (676); Statesboro, GA
January 2, 2020; 7:00 p.m., ESPN+		at Arkansas State	W 73–52	5–9 (1–2)	First National Bank Arena (1,276); Jonesboro, AR
January 4, 2020; 2:00 p.m., ESPN+		at Little Rock	L 89–92	5–10 (1–3)	Jack Stephens Center (1,203); Little Rock, AR
January 6, 2020; 7:00 p.m., ESPN+		South Alabama	L 54–66	5–11 (1–4)	College Park Center (1,282); Arlington, TX
January 9, 2020; 7:00 p.m., ESPN+		Appalachian State	W 66–56	6–11 (2–4)	College Park Center (1,272); Arlington, TX
January 11, 2020; 2:00 p.m., ESPN+		Coastal Carolina	L 77–82	6–12 (2–5)	College Park Center (1,416); Arlington, TX
January 16, 2020; 7:00 p.m., ESPN+		at Louisiana	W 81–65	7–12 (3–5)	Cajundome (3,838); Lafayette, LA
January 18, 2020; 2:00 p.m., ESPN+		at Louisiana–Monroe	W 78–58	8–12 (4–5)	Fant–Ewing Coliseum (1,902); Monroe, LA
January 25, 2020; 4:00 p.m., ESPN+		at Texas State	W 64–62	9–12 (5–5)	Strahan Arena (4,084); San Marcos, TX
January 30, 2020; 7:00 p.m., ESPN+		Louisiana	L 65–66	9–13 (5–6)	College Park Center (1,880); Arlington, TX
February 1, 2020; 2:00 p.m., ESPN+		Louisiana–Monroe	L 54–68	10–13 (6–6)	College Park Center (1,634); Arlington, TX
February 6, 2020; 6:00 p.m., ESPN+		at Appalachian State	L 50–57	10–14 (6–7)	Holmes Center (1,425); Boone, NC
February 8, 2020; 1:00 p.m., ESPN+		at Coastal Carolina	L 75–89	10–15 (6–8)	HTC Center (1,502); Conway, SC
February 13, 2020; 7:00 p.m., ESPN+		Arkansas State	W 77–67	11–15 (7–8)	College Park Center (1,499); Arlington, TX
February 15, 2020; 2:00 p.m., ESPN+		Little Rock	W 76–65	12–15 (8–8)	College Park Center (1,340); Arlington, TX
February 20, 2020; 7:00 p.m., ESPN+		Georgia State	W 70–62	13–15 (9–8)	College Park Center (1,671); Arlington, TX
February 22, 2020; 2:00 p.m., ESPN+		Georgia Southern	L 61–81	13–16 (9–9)	College Park Center (1,875); Arlington, TX
February 28, 2020; 8:00 p.m., ESPN2		Texas State	L 85–87 ^{3OT}	13–17 (9–10)	College Park Center (3,309); Arlington, TX
March 3, 2020; 6:00 p.m., ESPN+		at Troy	W 78–64	14–17 (10–10)	Trojan Arena (3,006); Troy, AL
Sun Belt tournament
March 7, 2020; 2:00 p.m., ESPN+	(7)	(10) Coastal Carolina; First round	L 62–63	14–18	College Park Center (1,125); Arlington, TX
*Non-conference game. ^{#}Rankings from AP poll. (#) Tournament seedings in parentheses. All times are in Central.
