= 2019–20 Coastal Carolina Chanticleers men's basketball team =

American college basketball season

2019–20 Coastal Carolina Chanticleers men's basketball
- Conference: Sun Belt Conference
- Record: 16–17 (8–12 Sun Belt)
- Head coach: Cliff Ellis (13th season)
- Associate head coach: Benny Moss
- Assistant coaches: Patrice Days; Elwyn McRoy
- Home arena: HTC Center

2019–20 Sun Belt Conference men's basketball standings
| | Conf. | | | | Overall |
| Team | W | | L | PCT | W | | L | PCT |
|---|---|---|---|---|---|---|---|---|
| Little Rock | 15 | – | 5 | .750 | 21 | – | 10 | .677 |
| South Alabama | 13 | – | 7 | .650 | 20 | – | 11 | .645 |
| Texas State | 13 | – | 7 | .650 | 21 | – | 11 | .656 |
| Georgia State | 12 | – | 8 | .600 | 19 | – | 13 | .594 |
| Georgia Southern | 12 | – | 8 | .600 | 20 | – | 13 | .606 |
| Appalachian State | 11 | – | 9 | .550 | 18 | – | 15 | .545 |
| UT Arlington | 10 | – | 10 | .500 | 14 | – | 18 | .438 |
| Louisiana | 8 | – | 12 | .400 | 14 | – | 19 | .424 |
| Arkansas State | 8 | – | 12 | .400 | 16 | – | 16 | .500 |
| Coastal Carolina | 8 | – | 12 | .400 | 16 | – | 17 | .485 |
| Louisiana–Monroe | 5 | – | 15 | .250 | 9 | – | 20 | .310 |
| Troy | 5 | – | 15 | .250 | 9 | – | 22 | .290 |
Note: The 2020 Sun Belt Tournament was canceled after the quarterfinals due to the COVID-19 pandemic.

The 2019–20 Coastal Carolina Chanticleers men's basketball team represented Coastal Carolina University in the 2019–20 NCAA Division I men's basketball season. The Chanticleers, led by 13th-year head coach Cliff Ellis, played their home games at the HTC Center in Conway, South Carolina as members of the Sun Belt Conference. They finished the season 16–17, 8–12 in Sun Belt play to finish in a three-way tie for eighth place. They defeated UT Arlington in the first round of the Sun Belt tournament before losing in the second round to Appalachian State.

== Previous season ==
The Chanticleers finished the 2018–19 season 17–17, 9–9 in Sun Belt play to finish in a tie for 6th place. They were defeated by Louisiana–Monroe in the second round of the Sun Belt tournament. They were invited to the CBI, where they defeated Howard in the first round, West Virginia in the quarterfinals, before falling to DePaul in the semifinals.

== Roster ==
2019–20 Coastal Carolina Chanticleers men's basketball team
Players
Coaches

| Pos. | # | Name | Height | Weight | Year | Hometown |
|---|---|---|---|---|---|---|
| G | 0 | Ebrima Dibba (injured) | 6 ft 6 in (1.98 m) | 200 lb (91 kg) | So | Bredäng, Sweden |
| G | 2 | Garrick Green | 6 ft 6 in (1.98 m) | 205 lb (93 kg) | Jr | Baton Rouge, Louisiana |
| G | 3 | DeVante' Jones | 6 ft 1 in (1.85 m) | 200 lb (91 kg) | So | New Orleans, Louisiana |
| G | 5 | Josh Peterson | 5 ft 10 in (1.78 m) | 165 lb (75 kg) | Sr | Woodbridge, Virginia |
| G | 10 | Tyrell Gumbs-Frater | 6 ft 3 in (1.91 m) | 190 lb (86 kg) | Sr | Richmond Hill, Ontario |
| F | 11 | Tim Ceaser | 6 ft 8 in (2.03 m) | 200 lb (91 kg) | Fr | Marion, Arkansas |
| F | 12 | Hosana Kitenge | 6 ft 7 in (2.01 m) | 265 lb (120 kg) | Fr | Crawley, West Sussex, England |
| G | 14 | Malik LeGania | 6 ft 5 in (1.96 m) | 180 lb (82 kg) | So | New Orleans, Louisiana |
| F | 15 | Isaac Hippolyte | 6 ft 7 in (2.01 m) | 210 lb (95 kg) | So | Spring Valley, New York |
| F | 20 | Ahmard Harvey | 6 ft 6 in (1.98 m) | 190 lb (86 kg) | Fr | Freeport, Bahamas |
| G | 21 | Jalen Milner | 6 ft 1 in (1.85 m) | 175 lb (79 kg) | Fr | Milledgeville, Georgia |
| C | 32 | Levi Cook | 6 ft 10 in (2.08 m) | 280 lb (127 kg) | Jr | Arnett, West Virginia |
| F | 33 | Tommy Burton | 6 ft 8 in (2.03 m) | 215 lb (98 kg) | Sr | Montgomery, Alabama |
| C | 44 | Essam Mostafa (redshirt) | 6 ft 9 in (2.06 m) | 270 lb (122 kg) | Fr | Cairo, Egypt |

Head coach

- Cliff Ellis (Florida State)

Assistant coach(es)

- Benny Moss (Charlotte)
- Patrice Days (New Orleans)
- Elwyn McRoy (Cleveland State)

Legend

- (C) Team captain
- (S) Suspended
- (I) Ineligible
- (W) Walk-on
- Injured
- Current redshirt

Roster
Last update: February 12, 2020

== Schedule and results ==
| Date time, TV | Rank^{#} | Opponent^{#} | Result | Record | Site (attendance) city, state |
Non-conference regular season
| November 5, 2019*; 7:00 pm, ESPN+ | | Campbell | L 74–75 | 0–1 | HTC Center (1,776); Conway, SC |
| November 8, 2019*; 7:30 pm | | Hampden–Sydney | W 102–66 | 1–1 | HTC Center (1,261); Conway, SC |
| November 12, 2019*; 7:00 pm, ESPN+ | | Northern Kentucky | L 68–69 | 1–2 | HTC Center (1,015); Conway, SC |
| November 18, 2019*; 7:00 pm, ESPN+ | | Middle Tennessee; Myrtle Beach Invitational non-bracketed game | W 93–72 | 2–2 | HTC Center (1,187); Conway, SC |
| November 21, 2019*; 7:00 pm, ESPNews | | Utah; Myrtle Beach Invitational quarterfinals | W 79–57 | 3–2 | HTC Center (2,269); Conway, SC |
| November 22, 2019*; 5:00 pm, ESPNU | | No. 24 Baylor; Myrtle Beach Invitational semifinals | L 65–77 | 3–3 | HTC Center (2,361); Conway, SC |
| November 24, 2019*; 1:00 pm, ESPNews | | Mississippi State; Myrtle Beach Invitational 3rd-place game | L 56–81 | 3–4 | HTC Center (1,934); Conway, SC |
| November 30, 2019*; 6:00 pm | | at Delaware State | W 92–77 | 4–4 | Memorial Hall (191); Dover, DE |
| December 4, 2019*; 7:00 pm | | Greensboro | W 114–79 | 5–4 | HTC Center (1,340); Conway, SC |
| December 7, 2019*; 7:00 pm, ESPN+ | | at Winthrop | W 92–88 | 6–4 | Winthrop Coliseum (2,734); Rock Hill, SC |
| December 14, 2019*; 2:00 pm, ESPN+ | | North Carolina Central | W 91–71 | 7–4 | HTC Center (987); Conway, SC |
Sun Belt Conference regular season
| December 19, 2019; 7:00 pm, ESPN+ | | at Troy | L 59–77 | 7–5 (0–1) | Trojan Arena (2,005); Troy, AL |
| December 21, 2019; 4:00 pm, ESPN+ | | at South Alabama | W 81–69 | 8–5 (1–1) | Mitchell Center (1,122); Mobile, AL |
| January 2, 2020; 7:00 pm, ESPN+ | | Georgia Southern | L 67–70 | 8–6 (1–2) | HTC Center (811); Conway, SC |
| January 4, 2020; 2:00 pm, ESPN+ | | Georgia State | W 74–72 | 9–6 (2–2) | HTC Center (937); Conway, SC |
| January 6, 2020; 7:00 pm, ESPN+ | | Louisiana–Monroe | W 93–64 | 10–6 (3–2) | HTC Center (676); Conway, SC |
| January 9, 2020; 8:00 pm, ESPN+ | | at Texas State | L 66–78 | 10–7 (3–3) | Strahan Arena (1,153); San Marcos, TX |
| January 11, 2020; 3:00 pm, ESPN+ | | at UT Arlington | W 82–77 | 11–7 (4–3) | College Park Center (1,416); Arlington, TX |
| January 16, 2020; 7:00 pm, ESPN+ | | Little Rock | L 55–71 | 11–8 (4–4) | HTC Center (1,521); Conway, SC |
| January 18, 2020; 2:00 pm, ESPN+ | | Arkansas State | L 75–80 | 11–9 (4–5) | HTC Center (1,313); Conway, SC |
| January 25, 2020; 2:00 pm, ESPN+ | | Appalachian State | L 58–78 | 11–10 (4–6) | HTC Center (1,091); Conway, SC |
| January 30, 2020; 7:30 pm, ESPN+ | | at Little Rock | L 79–96 | 11–11 (4–7) | Jack Stephens Center (1,562); Little Rock, AR |
| February 1, 2020; 5:00 pm, ESPN+ | | at Arkansas State | W 83–77 | 12–11 (5–7) | First National Bank Arena (1,697); Jonesboro, AR |
| February 6, 2020; 7:00 pm, ESPN+ | | Texas State | L 63–100 | 12–12 (5–8) | HTC Center (1,497); Conway, SC |
| February 8, 2020; 2:00 pm, ESPN+ | | UT Arlington | W 89–75 | 13–12 (6–8) | HTC Center (1,502); Conway, SC |
| February 13, 2020; 7:00 pm, ESPN+ | | at Georgia Southern | L 69–79 | 13–13 (6–9) | Hanner Fieldhouse (1,177); Statesboro, GA |
| February 15, 2020; 2:00 pm, ESPN+ | | at Georgia State | L 80–92 | 13–14 (6–10) | GSU Sports Arena (2,282); Atlanta, GA |
| February 20, 2020; 7:00 pm, ESPN+ | | Troy | W 90–60 | 14–14 (7–10) | HTC Center (1,111); Conway, SC |
| February 22, 2020; 2:00 pm, ESPN+ | | South Alabama | L 71–74 | 14–15 (7–11) | HTC Center (1,127); Conway, SC |
| February 29, 2020; 4:30 pm, ESPN+ | | at Appalachian State | W 84–77 | 15–15 (8–11) | Holmes Center (3,027); Boone, NC |
| March 3, 2020; 8:00 pm, ESPN+ | | at Louisiana | L 101–108 | 15–16 (8–12) | Cajundome (3,489); Lafayette, LA |
Sun Belt tournament
| March 7, 2020; 3:00 pm, ESPN+ | (10) | at (7) UT Arlington; First round | W 63–62 | 16–16 | College Park Center (1,125); Arlington, TX |
| March 9, 2020; 6:00 pm, ESPN+ | (10) | at (6) Appalachian State; Second round | L 65–70 | 16–17 | Holmes Center (1,053); Boone, NC |
*Non-conference game. ^{#}Rankings from AP Poll. (#) Tournament seedings in parentheses. All times are in Eastern.
