= 2019–20 Georgia State Panthers men's basketball team =

American college basketball season

2019–20 Georgia State Panthers men's basketball

Empire Classic Riverside Subregional champions
- Conference: Sun Belt Conference
- Record: 19–13 (12–8 Sun Belt)
- Head coach: Rob Lanier (1st season)
- Assistant coaches: Jarvis Hayes (1st season); Chris Kreider (1st season); Cliff Warren (1st season)
- Home arena: GSU Sports Arena

2019–20 Sun Belt Conference men's basketball standings
	Conf.				Overall
Team	W		L	PCT	W		L	PCT
Little Rock	15	–	5	.750	21	–	10	.677
South Alabama	13	–	7	.650	20	–	11	.645
Texas State	13	–	7	.650	21	–	11	.656
Georgia State	12	–	8	.600	19	–	13	.594
Georgia Southern	12	–	8	.600	20	–	13	.606
Appalachian State	11	–	9	.550	18	–	15	.545
UT Arlington	10	–	10	.500	14	–	18	.438
Louisiana	8	–	12	.400	14	–	19	.424
Arkansas State	8	–	12	.400	16	–	16	.500
Coastal Carolina	8	–	12	.400	16	–	17	.485
Louisiana–Monroe	5	–	15	.250	9	–	20	.310
Troy	5	–	15	.250	9	–	22	.290
Note: The 2020 Sun Belt Tournament was canceled after the quarterfinals due to the COVID-19 pandemic.

The 2019–20 Georgia State Panthers men's basketball team represented Georgia State University during the 2019–20 NCAA Division I men's basketball season. The team's head coach was Rob Lanier, who was coaching his first season at Georgia State. The Panthers played their home games at the GSU Sports Arena in Atlanta, Georgia as a member of the Sun Belt Conference. They finished the season 19–13, 12–8 in Sun Belt play to finish in a tie for fourth place. They were the No. 4 seed in the Sun Belt tournament, where they lost to Georgia Southern.

== Previous season ==
The Panthers finished the season 24–10, 13–5 in the Sun Belt, claiming the title of SBC regular season champions. The Panthers also went on to defeat Texas State and UT Arlington to become back-to-back champions of the Sun Belt tournament. As a result, they received the Sun Belt's automatic bid to the NCAA tournament. As the No. 14 seed in the Midwest region, they lost to Houston in the first round. After losing in the NCAA tournament, it was reported that head coach Ron Hunter had been offered the head coaching position at Tulane, to which he responded that he was going to take 48 hours to think about the future. On March 24, Tulane officially announced Hunter as head coach. It was later reported Hunter opted to leave Georgia State due to a disagreement between the university and Hunter over contract details regarding performance bonuses, tying them to his team's GPA, which was purported by the university to be declining year after year. On 5 April 2019, Georgia State announced the selection of Rob Lanier, associate head coach for the Tennessee Vols, to head the program at GSU.

== Offseason ==
=== Departures ===
Name	Number	Pos.	Height	Weight	Year	Hometown	Notes
Malik Benlevi	2	F	6'6"	225	Senior	Savannah, GA	Graduated
D'Marcus Simonds	15	G	6'3"	195	Junior	Gainesville, GA	Declared for NBA draft
James Wall	21	F	6'8"	190	Freshman	Canton, GA	Walk-on; did not return
Devin Mitchell	24	G	6'4"	190	Senior	Lawrenceville, GA	Graduated
Jeff Thomas	30	F	6'5"	190	Senior	Norwalk, OH	Graduated
Matt Chism	35	G	6'3"	185	Sophomore	Dawsonville, GA	Walk-on; did not return
Jordan Tyson	50	F	6'9"	220	Senior	Cincinnati, OH	Graduated

=== Incoming transfers ===
Name	Number	Pos.	Height	Weight	Year	Hometown	Previous School
JoJo Toppin	4	G	6'5"	175	Sophomore	Brooklyn, NY	Georgia. Under NCAA transfer rules, Toppin will have to sit out for the 2019–20 season, using a redshirt, leaving three years of eligibility remaining.
Eliel Nsoseme	NA	F	6'9"	225	Junior	Kinshasa, Congo	Cincinnati. Under NCAA transfer rules, Nsoseme will have to sit out for the 2019–20 season, using a redshirt, leaving two years of eligibility remaining.
Ryan Boyce	32	G	6'6"	190	RS Freshman	Memphis, TN	Memphis. Under NCAA transfer rules, Boyce will have to sit out for the remainder of the 2019–20 season, leaving three years of eligibility remaining.

=== 2019 recruiting class ===
College recruiting information
Name	Hometown	School	Height	Weight	Commit date
Kalik Brooks; G	Alpharetta, GA	Alpharetta	6 ft 5 in (1.96 m)	170 lb (77 kg)	Walk-on
Kalik Brooks; G	Recruit ratings: Scout: Rivals: 247Sports: ESPN: (NA)				
Joe Jones III; C	Buffalo, NY	The Park School	6 ft 9 in (2.06 m)	245 lb (111 kg)	Jun 2, 2019
Joe Jones III; C	Recruit ratings: Scout: Rivals: 247Sports: ESPN: (N/A)				
Jalen Thomas; F	Detroit, MI	University of Detroit Jesuit	6 ft 10 in (2.08 m)	230 lb (100 kg)	May 24, 2019
Jalen Thomas; F	Recruit ratings: Scout: Rivals: 247Sports: ESPN: (N/A)				
Overall recruit ranking: Scout: 106 Rivals: NA ESPN: NA
Note: In many cases, Scout, Rivals, 247Sports, On3, and ESPN may conflict in their listings of height and weight.; In these cases, the average was taken. ESPN grades are on a 100-point scale.; Sources: "Georgia State Commit List for 2019". Rivals.; "Georgia State Panthers". ESPN.; "2019 Team Ranking". Rivals.

== Roster ==
2019–20 Georgia State Panthers men's basketball team
Players
Coaches

Pos.	#	Name	Height	Weight	Year	Previous school	Hometown
F	0	Kavonte Ivery	6 ft 6 in (1.98 m)	215 lb (98 kg)	So	Stockbridge	Stockbridge, GA
G	1	Damon Wilson	6 ft 5 in (1.96 m)	190 lb (86 kg)	RS Sr	Our Savior New American / Pittsburgh	New York, NY
G	2	Justin Roberts	5 ft 9 in (1.75 m)	170 lb (77 kg)	RS So	Henderson International School / DePaul	Indianapolis, IN
G	4	JoJo Toppin (redshirt)	6 ft 5 in (1.96 m)	175 lb (79 kg)	RS So	Norcross High School / Georgia	Brooklyn, NY
G	10	Nelson Phillips	6 ft 4 in (1.93 m)	185 lb (84 kg)	So	Warner Robins	Warner Robins, GA
G	11	Corey Allen	6 ft 2 in (1.88 m)	205 lb (93 kg)	RS Jr	Ypsilanti / Detroit	Ypsilanti, MI
G	12	Kane Williams	6 ft 3 in (1.91 m)	190 lb (86 kg)	Jr	South Paulding	Douglasville, GA
F	14	Chris Clerkly	6 ft 8 in (2.03 m)	240 lb (109 kg)	Sr	Perry	Perry, GA
F	20	Josh Linder	6 ft 8 in (2.03 m)	210 lb (95 kg)	Jr	Veterans	Kathleen, GA
G	21	Kalik Brooks (W)	6 ft 5 in (1.96 m)	170 lb (77 kg)	Fr	Alpharetta	Alpharetta, GA
C	23	Joe Jones III	6 ft 9 in (2.06 m)	245 lb (111 kg)	Fr	The Park School	Buffalo, NY
F	25	Jalen Thomas	6 ft 10 in (2.08 m)	230 lb (104 kg)	Fr	University of Detroit Jesuit	Detroit, MI
G	32	Ryan Boyce (redshirt)	6 ft 6 in (1.98 m)	190 lb (86 kg)	RS Fr	East High / Memphis	Memphis, TN
F	NA	Eliel Nsoseme (redshirt)	6 ft 9 in (2.06 m)	225 lb (102 kg)	Jr	The RISE Centre Academy / Cincinnati	Kinshasa, Congo

Head coach

- Rob Lanier (St. Bonaventure)

Assistant coach(es)

- Jarvis Hayes (Georgia)
- Chris Kreider (Lebanon Valley)
- Cliff Warren (Mount St. Mary's)

Legend

- (C) Team captain
- (S) Suspended
- (I) Ineligible
- (W) Walk-on
- Injured
- Current redshirt

== Regular season ==
- The Panthers won the regional championship of the 2K Empire Classic.
- Kane Williams and Justin Roberts were named to the All-Tournament Team of the Empire Classic. Williams was also named the regional MVP.

== Schedule and results ==
Date time, TV	Rank^{#}	Opponent^{#}	Result	Record	High points	High rebounds	High assists	Site (attendance) city, state
Exhibition
November 1, 2019*; 7:00 pm		Point	W 101–66		20 – Allen	10 – Wilson	5 – Tied	GSU Sports Arena (824); Atlanta, GA
Regular season
November 6, 2019*; 7:00 pm, ESPN+		Brewton–Parker	W 104–35	1–0	22 – Wilson	9 – Jones III	6 – Williams	GSU Sports Arena (1,644); Atlanta, GA
November 9, 2019*; 2:00 pm, FloHoops		at College of Charleston	L 80–84	1–1	22 – Roberts	12 – Linder	3 – Roberts	TD Arena (3,853); Charleston, SC
November 15, 2019*; 7:00 pm, ACC Network		at No. 2 Duke; 2K Empire Classic campus-site game	L 63–74	1–2	20 – Allen	7 – Wilson	7 – Williams	Cameron Indoor Stadium (9,314); Durham, NC
November 17, 2019*; 7:30 pm, FS1		at Georgetown; 2K Empire Classic campus-site game	L 83–91	1–3	21 – Allen	11 – Linder	4 – Roberts	Capital One Arena (4,118); Washington, D.C.
November 22, 2019*; 8:00 pm, FloHoops		vs. Prairie View A&M; 2K Empire Classic subregional semifinals	W 83–72	2–3	18 – Allen	6 – Tied	6 – Wilson	CBU Events Center (234); Riverside, CA
November 23, 2019*; 10:00 pm, FloHoops		vs. Cal Baptist; 2K Empire Classic subregional finals	W 69–60	3–3	14 – Tied	8 – Wilson	5 – Williams	CBU Events Center (1,946); Riverside, CA
November 27, 2019*; 2:00 pm		Charlotte	W 81–78 ^{OT}	4–3	17 – Allen	6 – Williams	7 – Williams	GSU Sports Arena (1,468); Atlanta, GA
December 3, 2019*; 7:00 pm, ESPN+		Dartmouth	W 83–80 ^{OT}	5–3	28 – Allen	8 – Williams	4 – Tied	GSU Sports Arena (1,340); Atlanta, GA
December 7, 2019*; 4:30 pm		at Mercer	W 73–64	6–3	16 – Tied	5 – Tied	6 – Roberts	Hawkins Arena (1,564); Macon, GA
December 19, 2019; 7:00 pm, ESPN+		UT Arlington	W 83–77	7–3 (1–0)	22 – Wilson	9 – Williams	6 – Roberts	GSU Sports Arena (1,057); Atlanta, GA
December 21, 2019; 2:00 pm, ESPN+		Texas State	W 81–69	8–3 (2–0)	17 – Tied	11 – Jones III	4 – Tied	GSU Sports Arena (1,531); Atlanta, GA
December 23, 2019*; 7:00 pm, ESPN3		at SMU	L 76–85	8–4	22 – Williams	5 – Linder	3 – Tied	Moody Coliseum (4,085); Dallas, TX
December 30, 2019*; 7:00 pm, ESPN+		Middle Georgia State	W 83–53	9–4	22 – Roberts	9 – Roberts	7 – Roberts	GSU Sports Arena (1,400); Atlanta, GA
January 2, 2020; 7:00 pm, ESPN+		at Appalachian State	W 69–60	10–4 (3–0)	14 – Thomas	7 – Phillips	9 – Williams	George M. Holmes Convocation Center (1,253); Boone, NC
January 4, 2020; 2:00 pm, ESPN+		at Coastal Carolina	L 72–74	10–5 (3–1)	16 – Roberts	10 – Jones III	7 – Williams	HTC Center (937); Conway, SC
January 6, 2020; 8:00 pm, ESPN+		at Arkansas State	L 87–90	10–6 (3–2)	19 – Wilson	8 – Wilson	7 – Roberts	First National Bank Arena (1,105); Jonesboro, AR
January 9, 2020; 7:00 pm, ESPN+		Louisiana	W 90–52	11–6 (4–2)	24 – Allen	5 – Clerkley	8 – Williams	GSU Sports Arena (1,336); Atlanta, GA
January 11, 2020; 2:00 pm, ESPN+		Louisiana–Monroe	W 84–62	12–6 (5–2)	23 – Roberts	5 – Allen	5 – Tied	GSU Sports Arena (1,954); Atlanta, GA
January 16, 2020; 8:00 pm, ESPN+		at South Alabama	W 72–63	13–6 (6–2)	20 – Roberts	11 – Wilson	5 – Wilson	Mitchell Center (1,744); Mobile, AL
February 1, 2020; 2:00 pm, ESPN+		at Troy	L 65–75	13–7 (6–3)	15 – Roberts	7 – Wilson	7 – Roberts	Trojan Arena (2,282); Troy, AL
January 25, 2020; 5:00 pm, ESPN+		at Georgia Southern; Modern Day Hate	W 82–77	14–7 (7–3)	15 – Williams	8 – Phillips	3 – Tied	Hanner Fieldhouse (3,897); Statesboro, GA
January 30, 2020; 7:00 pm, ESPN+		South Alabama	W 76–73	15–7 (8–3)	19 – Allen	7 – Tied	5 – Williams	GSU Sports Arena (1,829); Atlanta, GA
February 1, 2020; 2:00 pm, ESPN+		Troy	L 78–84	15–8 (8–4)	25 – Allen	9 – Williams	4 – Wilson	GSU Sports Arena (2,543); Atlanta, GA
February 6, 2020; 7:00 pm, ESPN+		at Louisiana	L 78–80	15–9 (8–5)	17 – Tied	7 – Tied	5 – Williams	Cajundome (3,537); Lafayette, LA
February 8, 2020; 2:00 pm, ESPN+		Louisiana–Monroe	W 77–69	16–9 (9–5)	19 – Williams	7 – Jones III	7 – Roberts	Fant–Ewing Coliseum (2,381); Monroe, LA
February 13, 2020; 7:00 pm, ESPN+		Appalachian State	W 76–65	17–9 (10–5)	17 – Roberts	7 – Williams	5 – Tied	GSU Sports Arena (2,273); Atlanta, GA
February 15, 2020; 2:00 pm, ESPN+		Coastal Carolina	W 92–80	18–9 (11–5)	20 – Tied	7 – Williams	6 – Roberts	GSU Sports Arena (2,282); Atlanta, GA
February 20, 2020; 8:00 pm, ESPN+		at UT Arlington	L 62–70	18–10 (11–6)	21 – Williams	9 – Wilson	5 – Williams	College Park Center (1,671); Arlington, TX
February 22, 2020; 5:00 pm, ESPN+		Texas State	L 76–86	18–11 (11–7)	23 – Williams	7 – Williams	6 – Williams	Strahan Arena (2,718); San Marcos, TX
February 29, 2020; 2:00 pm, ESPN+		Georgia Southern; Modern Day Hate	W 79–70	18–12 (11–8)	21 – Roberts	7 – Phillips	4 – Roberts	GSU Sports Arena (3,854); Atlanta, GA
March 3, 2020; 7:00 pm, ESPN+		Little Rock	W 89–70	19–12 (12–8)	21 – Williams	6 – Tied	7 – Williams	GSU Sports Arena (1,855); Atlanta, GA
Sun Belt tournament
March 11, 2020; 6:00 pm, ESPN+	(4)	(5) Georgia Southern; Quarterfinals/Modern Day Hate	L 62–81	19–13	20 – Williams	5 – Williams	4 – Williams	GSU Sports Arena (2,843); Atlanta, GA
*Non-conference game. ^{#}Rankings from AP Poll. (#) Tournament seedings in parentheses. All times are in Eastern Time.
