= 2019–20 Louisiana–Monroe Warhawks men's basketball team =

American college basketball season

2019–20 Louisiana–Monroe Warhawks men's basketball
- Conference: Sun Belt Conference
- Record: 9–20 (5–15 Sun Belt)
- Head coach: Keith Richard (10th season)
- Associate head coach: Ryan Cross
- Assistant coach: Ronnie Dean
- Home arena: Fant–Ewing Coliseum

2019–20 Sun Belt Conference men's basketball standings
	Conf.				Overall
Team	W		L	PCT	W		L	PCT
Little Rock	15	–	5	.750	21	–	10	.677
South Alabama	13	–	7	.650	20	–	11	.645
Texas State	13	–	7	.650	21	–	11	.656
Georgia State	12	–	8	.600	19	–	13	.594
Georgia Southern	12	–	8	.600	20	–	13	.606
Appalachian State	11	–	9	.550	18	–	15	.545
UT Arlington	10	–	10	.500	14	–	18	.438
Louisiana	8	–	12	.400	14	–	19	.424
Arkansas State	8	–	12	.400	16	–	16	.500
Coastal Carolina	8	–	12	.400	16	–	17	.485
Louisiana–Monroe	5	–	15	.250	9	–	20	.310
Troy	5	–	15	.250	9	–	22	.290
Note: The 2020 Sun Belt Tournament was canceled after the quarterfinals due to the COVID-19 pandemic.

The 2019–20 Louisiana–Monroe Warhawks men's basketball team represented the University of Louisiana at Monroe in the 2019–20 NCAA Division I men's basketball season. The Warhawks, led by 10th-year head coach Keith Richard, played their home games at Fant–Ewing Coliseum in Monroe, Louisiana as members of the Sun Belt Conference. They finished the season 9–20, 5–15 in Sun Belt play to finish in a tie for 11th place. They failed to qualify for the Sun Belt tournament.

== Previous season ==
The Warhawks finished the 2018–19 season 19–16, 9–9 in Sun Belt play to finish in a tie for 6th place. In the Sun Belt tournament, they defeated Appalachian State in the first round, Coastal Carolina in the second round, before falling to Georgia Southern in the quarterfinals. They were invited to the CIT, where they defeated Kent State in the first round, before falling to Texas Southern in the quarterfinals.

== Roster ==
2019–20 Louisiana–Monroe Warhawks men's basketball team
Players
Coaches

Pos.	#	Name	Height	Weight	Year	Hometown
C	0	Chris Efretuei	7 ft 1 in (2.16 m)	260 lb (118 kg)	Jr	Abuja, Nigeria
G	1	Erie Olonade	5 ft 11 in (1.8 m)	180 lb (82 kg)	Jr	Houston, Texas
G	2	Michael Ertel	6 ft 2 in (1.88 m)	190 lb (86 kg)	Jr	Indianapolis, Indiana
G	3	JD Williams	6 ft 5 in (1.96 m)	180 lb (82 kg)	Sr	Birmingham, Alabama
F	5	Tyree White	6 ft 8 in (2.03 m)	190 lb (86 kg)	Sr	St. Louis, Missouri
G	10	Langston Powell	6 ft 5 in (1.96 m)	195 lb (88 kg)	So	West Monroe, Louisiana
G	11	Zion Simmons	6 ft 0 in (1.83 m)	180 lb (82 kg)	Fr	Monroe, Louisiana
G	13	Jalen Hodge	6 ft 1 in (1.85 m)	180 lb (82 kg)	So	O'Fallon, Illinois
F	14	Elijah Ifejeh	6 ft 7 in (2.01 m)	240 lb (109 kg)	Jr	Montreal, Quebec
G	15	Josh Nicholas	6 ft 3 in (1.91 m)	190 lb (86 kg)	Jr	Long Beach, New York
F	21	Luke Phillips	6 ft 10 in (2.08 m)	220 lb (100 kg)	So	Adelaide, Australia
F	22	D'Andre Bernard	6 ft 8 in (2.03 m)	190 lb (86 kg)	GS	Toronto, Ontario
F	23	Youry White	6 ft 8 in (2.03 m)	205 lb (93 kg)	Sr	Baton Rouge, Louisiana
C	24	Dadou Traore	6 ft 10 in (2.08 m)	220 lb (100 kg)	Jr	Brazzaville, Republic of the Congo

Head coach

- Keith Richard (Northeast Louisiana)

Assistant coach(es)

- Ryan Cross (Buffalo)
- Ronnie Dean (Harris–Stowe State)

Legend

- (C) Team captain
- (S) Suspended
- (I) Ineligible
- (W) Walk-on
- Injured
- Current redshirt

Roster
Last update: December 24, 2019

== Schedule and results ==
Date time, TV	Opponent	Result	Record	Site (attendance) city, state
Regular season
November 5, 2019*; 7:00 pm, ESPN+	Louisiana College	W 64–41	1–0	Fant–Ewing Coliseum (2,498); Monroe, LA
November 9, 2019*; 11:00 am	Alcorn State	W 73–72 ^{OT}	2–0	Fant–Ewing Coliseum (1,472); Monroe, LA
November 11, 2019*; 7:00 pm, SECN+	at Texas A&M	L 57–63	2–1	Reed Arena (5,018); College Station, TX
November 14, 2019*; 6:00 pm, SECN	at Mississippi State	L 45–62	2–2	Humphrey Coliseum (5,582); Starkville, MS
November 26, 2019*; 7:00 pm, ESPN+	Northwestern State	W 77–69	3–2	Fant–Ewing Coliseum (1,515); Monroe, LA
December 4, 2019*; 7:00 pm, ESPN+	Millsaps	W 86–63	4–2	Fant–Ewing Coliseum (1,383); Monroe, LA
December 10, 2019*; 7:00 pm, ESPN+	Grambling State	L 61–66	4–3	Fant–Ewing Coliseum (2,019); Monroe, LA
December 14, 2019*; 8:00 pm, ESPN+	at Stephen F. Austin	L 59–66	4–4	William R. Johnson Coliseum (2,143); Nacogdoches, TX
December 19, 2019; 7:00 pm, ESPN+	Little Rock	L 72–73	4–5 (0–1)	Fant–Ewing Coliseum (1,862); Monroe, LA
December 21, 2019; 2:00 pm, ESPN+	Arkansas State	L 59–62	4–6 (0–2)	Fant–Ewing Coliseum (2,021); Monroe, LA
December 28, 2019*; 3:00 pm, FS1	at No. 12 Butler	L 36–67	4–7	Hinkle Fieldhouse (8,040); Indianapolis, IN
January 2, 2020; 7:00 pm, ESPN+	Troy	W 79–63	5–7 (1–2)	Fant–Ewing Coliseum (1,547); Monroe, LA
January 4, 2020; 2:00 pm, ESPN+	South Alabama	W 69–49	6–7 (2–2)	Fant–Ewing Coliseum (1,411); Monroe, LA
January 6, 2020; 6:00 pm, ESPN+	at Coastal Carolina	L 64–93	6–8 (2–3)	HTC Center (676); Conway, SC
January 9, 2020; 6:00 pm, ESPN+	at Georgia Southern	L 56–67	6–9 (2–4)	Hanner Fieldhouse (940); Statesboro, GA
January 11, 2020; 1:00 pm, ESPN+	at Georgia State	L 62–84	6–10 (2–5)	GSU Sports Arena (1,954); Atlanta, GA
January 16, 2020; 7:00 pm, ESPN+	Texas State	L 63–64	6–11 (2–6)	Fant–Ewing Coliseum (3,332); Monroe, LA
January 18, 2020; 2:00 pm, ESPN+	UT Arlington	L 58–78	6–12 (2–7)	Fant–Ewing Coliseum (1,902); Monroe, LA
January 25, 2020; 7:00 pm, ESPN+	at Louisiana	L 60–81	6–13 (2–8)	Cajundome (4,206); Lafayette, LA
January 30, 2020; 7:00 pm, ESPN+	at Texas State	L 51–71	6–14 (2–9)	Strahan Arena (2,143); San Marcos, TX
February 1, 2020; 2:00 pm, ESPN+	at UT Arlington	L 54–68	6–15 (2–10)	College Park Center (1,634); Arlington, TX
February 6, 2020; 7:00 pm, ESPN+	Georgia Southern	L 65–67	6–16 (2–11)	Fant–Ewing Coliseum (1,506); Monroe, LA
February 8, 2020; 2:00 pm, ESPN+	Georgia State	L 69–77	6–17 (2–12)	Fant–Ewing Coliseum (2,381); Monroe, LA
February 13, 2020; 6:00 pm, ESPN+	at Troy	W 74–71	7–17 (3–12)	Trojan Arena (2,222); Troy, AL
February 15, 2020; 3:00 pm, ESPN+	at South Alabama	L 49–50	7–18 (3–13)	Mitchell Center (1,482); Mobile, AL
February 19, 2020; 7:00 pm, ESPN+	at Arkansas State	W 66–52	8–18 (4–13)	First National Bank Arena (1,227); Jonesboro, AR
February 22, 2020; 2:00 pm, ESPN+	Louisiana	W 83–77	9–18 (5–13)	Fant–Ewing Coliseum (336); Monroe, LA
February 27, 2020; 6:30 pm, ESPN+	at Little Rock	L 63–79	9–19 (5–14)	Jack Stephens Center (2,126); Little Rock, AR
March 3, 2020; 7:00 pm, ESPN+	Appalachian State	L 57–61	9–20 (5–15)	Fant–Ewing Coliseum (1,677); Monroe, LA
*Non-conference game. ^{#}Rankings from AP Poll. (#) Tournament seedings in parentheses. All times are in Central.
