= 2019–20 Louisiana Ragin' Cajuns men's basketball team =

American college basketball season

2019–20 Louisiana Ragin' Cajuns men's basketball
- Conference: Sun Belt Conference
- Record: 14–19 (8–12 Sun Belt)
- Head coach: Bob Marlin (10th season)
- Assistant coaches: Neil Hardin; Brock Morris; Josten Crow
- Home arena: Cajundome

2019–20 Sun Belt Conference men's basketball standings
	Conf.				Overall
Team	W		L	PCT	W		L	PCT
Little Rock	15	–	5	.750	21	–	10	.677
South Alabama	13	–	7	.650	20	–	11	.645
Texas State	13	–	7	.650	21	–	11	.656
Georgia State	12	–	8	.600	19	–	13	.594
Georgia Southern	12	–	8	.600	20	–	13	.606
Appalachian State	11	–	9	.550	18	–	15	.545
UT Arlington	10	–	10	.500	14	–	18	.438
Louisiana	8	–	12	.400	14	–	19	.424
Arkansas State	8	–	12	.400	16	–	16	.500
Coastal Carolina	8	–	12	.400	16	–	17	.485
Louisiana–Monroe	5	–	15	.250	9	–	20	.310
Troy	5	–	15	.250	9	–	22	.290
Note: The 2020 Sun Belt Tournament was canceled after the quarterfinals due to the COVID-19 pandemic.

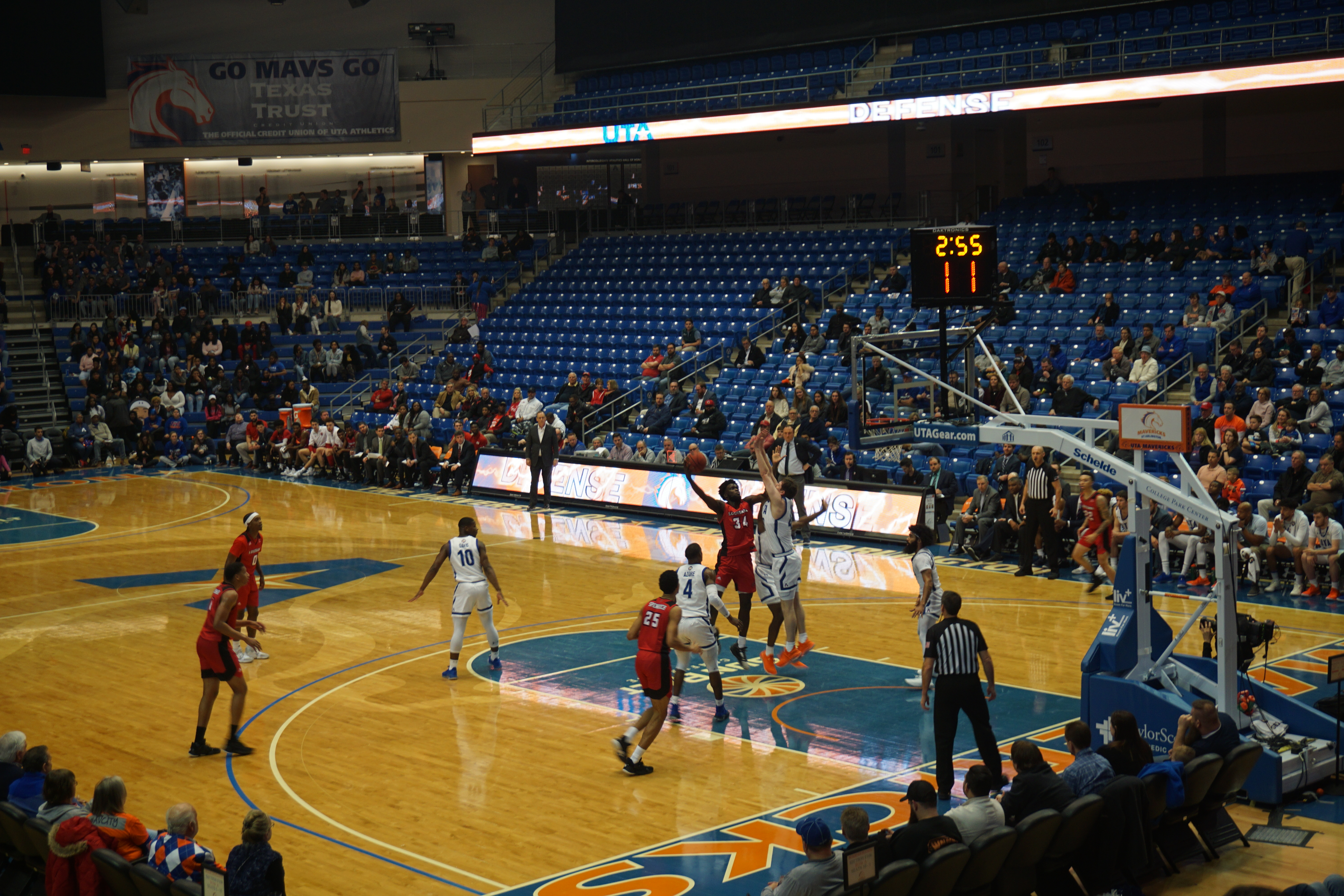
The Ragin' Cajuns in action at UT Arlington

The 2019–20 Louisiana Ragin' Cajuns men's basketball team represented the University of Louisiana at Lafayette during the 2019–20 NCAA Division I men's basketball season. The Ragin' Cajuns, led by tenth-year head coach Bob Marlin played their home games at the Cajundome as members of the Sun Belt Conference. They finished the season 14–19, 8–12 in Sun Belt play to finish in a three-way tie for eighth place. They defeated Arkansas State in the first round of the Sun Belt tournament before losing in the second round to Georgia Southern.

== Previous season ==
The Ragin' Cajuns finished the 2018–19 season 19–13, 10–8 in Sun Belt play to finish fifth in the conference. The Cajuns proceeded to the Sun Belt Conference Men's Basketball Tournament with a first-round bye. They ultimately lost to the South Alabama Jaguars in heartbreaking fashion by the score of 69–70 in the second round. They were not invited to any other post-season tournament.

== Roster ==
2019–20 Louisiana Ragin' Cajuns men's basketball team
Players
Coaches

Pos.	#	Name	Height	Weight	Year	Hometown
F	0	Cedric Russell	6 ft 2 in (1.88 m)	190 lb (86 kg)	Jr	Alexandria, Louisiana
F	1	Jalen Johnson	6 ft 7 in (2.01 m)	205 lb (93 kg)	RS Jr	Baton Rouge, Louisiana
G	3	TraJan Wesley	5 ft 9 in (1.75 m)	165 lb (75 kg)	So	Navasota, Texas
F	4	Kobe Julien	6 ft 6 in (1.98 m)	215 lb (98 kg)	RS Fr	Baton Rouge, Louisiana
G	5	Javonne Lowery	6 ft 3 in (1.91 m)	175 lb (79 kg)	Fr	Pearland, Texas
F	11	Tirus Smith	6 ft 8 in (2.03 m)	230 lb (104 kg)	Jr	Richton, Mississippi
G	13	Mylik Wilson	6 ft 3 in (1.91 m)	175 lb (79 kg)	Fr	Rayville, Louisiana
G	15	P.J. Hardy	6 ft 1 in (1.85 m)	170 lb (77 kg)	Sr	Lake Charles, Louisiana
G	22	Calvin Tempe	6 ft 0 in (1.83 m)	170 lb (77 kg)	Fr	Memphis, Tennessee
F	25	Chris Spenkuch	6 ft 7 in (2.01 m)	195 lb (88 kg)	RS Fr	Pembroke Pines, Florida
G	30	Durley Cadwell	6 ft 5 in (1.96 m)	185 lb (84 kg)	So	Houston, Texas
G	31	Mason Aucoin	6 ft 4 in (1.93 m)	205 lb (93 kg)	Sr	Luling, Louisiana
F	34	Dou Gueye	6 ft 9 in (2.06 m)	220 lb (100 kg)	Jr	Dakar, Senegal
F	33	Kristian Lafayette	6 ft 10 in (2.08 m)	200 lb (91 kg)	So	Detroit, Michigan

Head coach

- Bob Marlin (Mississippi State)

Assistant coach(es)

- Neil Hardin (West Florida)
- Brock Morris (Alabama)
- Josten Crow (Sam Houston State)

Legend

- (C) Team captain
- (S) Suspended
- (I) Ineligible
- (W) Walk-on
- Injured
- Current redshirt

Roster
Last update: September 29, 2019

=== Depth chart ===
Pos.	Starting 5	Bench
C
PF
SF
SG
PG

== Schedule and results ==
Date time, TV	Rank^{#}	Opponent^{#}	Result	Record	High points	High rebounds	High assists	Site (attendance) city, state
Regular season
11/05/2019*; 7:00 pm, ESPN+		Loyola (LA)	W 95–67	1–0	22 – Johnson	9 – Tied	4 – Wilson	Cajundome (3,504); Lafayette, LA
11/09/2019*; 7:00 pm, ESPN+		McNeese State	W 85–80	2–0	22 – Russell	7 – Johnson	5 – Wilson	Cajundome (4,233); Lafayette, LA
11/12/2019*; 7:00 pm, FSSW		at TCU; MGM Resorts Main Event	L 65–98	2–1	22 – Johnson	6 – Wilson	4 – Gueye	Schollmaier Arena (5,887); Fort Worth, TX
11/15/2019*; 7:00 pm, ESPN+		Youngstown State	W 73–61	3–1	23 – Julien	10 – Johnson	3 – Wesley	Cajundome (4,804); Lafayette, LA
11/21/2019*; 8:00 pm		at Wyoming; MGM Resorts Main Event	L 61–69 ^{OT}	3–2	15 – Julien	9 – Wilson	1 – Tied	Arena-Auditorium (2,860); Laramie, WY
11/25/2019*; 2:00 pm		vs. Detroit Mercy; MGM Resorts Main Event; Middleweight semifinal	W 81–62	4–2	18 – Johnson	11 – Gueye	6 – Wesley	Clark HS Gymnasium; Las Vegas, NV
11/26/2019*; 2:00 pm		vs. UC Irvine; MGM Resorts Main Event; Middleweight 3rd place game	L 67–92	4–3	18 – Hardy	8 – Julien	6 – Wesley	Clark HS Gymnasium; Las Vegas, NV
12/03/2019*; 7:00 pm, ESPN+		Southeastern Louisiana	W 98–81	5–3	26 – Johnson	10 – Johnson	7 – Julien	Cajundome (3,509); Lafayette, LA
12/07/2019*; 6:30 pm, P12N		at Arizona State	L 65–77	5–4	16 – Tied	8 – Wilson	4 – Wesley	Desert Financial Arena (7,685); Tempe, AZ
12/14/2019*; 4:00 pm, CUSA.TV		at Louisiana Tech	L 59–77	5–5	13 – Tied	9 – Johnson	8 – Tied	Thomas Assembly Center (4,032); Ruston, LA
12/18/2019; 7:00 pm, ESPN+		at Arkansas State	L 67–79	5–6 (0–1)	16 – Russell	8 – Smith	4 – Wesley	First National Bank Arena (1,177); Jonesboro, AR
12/21/2019; 7:00 pm, ESPN+		Little Rock	L 66–69	5–7 (0–2)	26 – Johnson	9 – Johnson	4 – Tied	Cajundome (3,469); Lafayette, LA
12/29/2019*; 5:00 pm, ESPN+		UC Santa Barbara	L 77–85	5–8	19 – Russell	7 – Gueye	5 – Wesley	Cajundome (3,455); Lafayette, LA
01/02/2020; 7:00 pm, ESPN+		South Alabama	L 57–60	5–9 (0–3)	17 – Wilson	9 – Gueye	6 – Russell	Cajundome (3,256); Lafayette, LA
01/04/2020; 7:00 pm, ESPN+		Troy	W 79–62	6–9 (1–3)	18 – Wilson	13 – Wilson	5 – Wilson	Cajundome (3,467); Lafayette, LA
01/06/2020; 6:00 pm, ESPN+		at Appalachian State	W 81–73	7–9 (2–3)	30 – Wilson	10 – Johnson	3 – 3 tied	Holmes Center (907); Boone, NC
01/09/2020; 6:00 pm, ESPN+		at Georgia State	L 52–90	7–10 (2–4)	12 – Johnson	7 – Johnson	2 – 3 tied	GSU Sports Arena (1,336); Atlanta, GA
01/11/2020; 3:00 pm, ESPN+		at Georgia Southern	L 51–71	7–11 (2–5)	15 – Johnson	7 – Gueye	5 – Temple	Hanner Fieldhouse (1,493); Statesboro, GA
01/16/2020; 7:00 pm, ESPN+		UT Arlington	L 65–81	7–12 (2–6)	23 – Johnson	11 – Smith	5 – Hardy	Cajundome (3,838); Lafayette, LA
01/18/2020; 7:00 pm, ESPN+		Texas State	L 59–68	7–13 (2–7)	18 – Johnson	7 – Johnson	5 – Temple	Cajundome (3,649); Lafayette, LA
01/25/2020; 7:00 pm, ESPN+		Louisiana–Monroe	W 81–60	8–13 (3–7)	27 – Johnson	7 – Johnson	4 – Russell	Cajundome (4,206); Lafayette, LA
01/30/2020; 7:00 pm, ESPN+		at UT Arlington	W 66–65	9–13 (4–7)	15 – Johnson	13 – Johnson	5 – Russell	College Park Center (1,880); Arlington, TX
02/01/2020; 4:30 pm, ESPN+		at Texas State	L 66–71	9–14 (4–8)	16 – Hardy	9 – Smith	3 – Tied	Strahan Arena (2,703); San Marcos, TX
02/06/2020; 7:00 pm, ESPN+		Georgia State	W 80–78	10–14 (5–8)	17 – Tied	10 – Johnson	3 – Tied	Cajundome (3,537); Lafayette, LA
02/08/2020; 7:00 pm, ESPN+		Georgia Southern	L 79–86	10–15 (5–9)	23 – Russell	9 – Wilson	3 – Wilson	Cajundome (3,876); Lafayette, LA
02/13/2020; 7:00 pm, ESPN+		at South Alabama	L 75–78	10–16 (5–10)	29 – Russell	14 – Smith	7 – Wilson	Mitchell Center (1,342); Mobile, AL
02/15/2020; 2:00 pm, ESPN+		at Troy	W 81–77	11–16 (6–10)	20 – Johnson	8 – Smith	4 – Russell	Trojan Arena (2,327); Troy, AL
02/22/2020; 2:00 pm, ESPN+		at Louisiana–Monroe	L 77–83	11–17 (6–11)	16 – Wesley	9 – Johnson	5 – Wilson	Fant-Ewing Coliseum (336); Monroe, LA
02/26/2020; 7:00 pm, ESPN+		Arkansas State	W 77–74	12–17 (7–11)	22 – Russell	8 – Wilson	5 – Russell	Cajundome (3,651); Lafayette, LA
02/29/2020; 2:00 pm, ESPN+		at Little Rock	L 69–91	12–18 (7–12)	18 – Wilson	13 – Gueye	4 – Wilson	Jack Stephens Center (2,705); Little Rock, AR
03/03/2020; 7:00 pm, ESPN+		Coastal Carolina	W 108–101	13–18 (8–12)	28 – Russell	11 – Gueye	8 – Wilson	Cajundome (3,489); Lafayette, LA
Sun Belt tournament
03/07/2020; 11:00 am, ESPN+	(8)	(9) Arkansas State; First round	W 73–66	14–18	17 – Wilson	12 – Wilson	5 – Wesley	Cajundome (3,141); Lafayette, LA
03/09/2020; 6:00 pm, ESPN+	(8)	(5) Georgia Southern; Second round	L 81–82	14–19	23 – Russell	14 – Gueye	4 – Wilson	Hanner Fieldhouse (4,378); Statesboro, GA
*Non-conference game. ^{#}Rankings from AP Poll. (#) Tournament seedings in parentheses. All times are in Central Time.
