= 2019–20 Texas State Bobcats men's basketball team =

American college basketball season

2019–20 Texas State Bobcats men's basketball
- Conference: Sun Belt Conference
- Record: 21–11 (13–7 Sun Belt)
- Head coach: Danny Kaspar (7th season)
- Assistant coaches: Jim Shaw; Terrence Johnson; Robert Guster
- Home arena: Strahan Arena

2019–20 Sun Belt Conference men's basketball standings
	Conf.				Overall
Team	W		L	PCT	W		L	PCT
Little Rock	15	–	5	.750	21	–	10	.677
South Alabama	13	–	7	.650	20	–	11	.645
Texas State	13	–	7	.650	21	–	11	.656
Georgia State	12	–	8	.600	19	–	13	.594
Georgia Southern	12	–	8	.600	20	–	13	.606
Appalachian State	11	–	9	.550	18	–	15	.545
UT Arlington	10	–	10	.500	14	–	18	.438
Louisiana	8	–	12	.400	14	–	19	.424
Arkansas State	8	–	12	.400	16	–	16	.500
Coastal Carolina	8	–	12	.400	16	–	17	.485
Louisiana–Monroe	5	–	15	.250	9	–	20	.310
Troy	5	–	15	.250	9	–	22	.290
Note: The 2020 Sun Belt Tournament was canceled after the quarterfinals due to the COVID-19 pandemic.

The 2019–20 Texas State Bobcats men's basketball team represented Texas State University in the 2019–20 NCAA Division I men's basketball season. The Bobcats, led by 7th-year head coach Danny Kaspar, played their home games at Strahan Arena in San Marcos, Texas as members of the Sun Belt Conference. They finished the season 21–11, 13–7 in Sun Belt play to finish in a tie for second place. They defeated Appalachian State in the quarterfinals of the Sun Belt tournament and were set to face South Alabama in the semifinals until the tournament was cancelled amid the COVID-19 pandemic.

On September 22, 2020, head coach Danny Kaspar resigned amid allegations of racially insensitive language used at players. He finished at Texas State with a seven-year record of 119–109.

== Previous season ==
The Bobcats finished the 2018–19 season 24–10, 12–6 in Sun Belt play to finish in a three-way tie for 2nd place. In the Sun Belt tournament, they defeated South Alabama in the quarterfinals, before falling to Georgia State in the semifinals. They were invited to the CIT, where they were defeated by FIU in the first round.

== Roster ==
2019–20 Texas State Bobcats men's basketball team
Players
Coaches

Pos.	#	Name	Height	Weight	Year	Hometown
G	0	DeShawn Davidson	6 ft 3 in (1.91 m)	200 lb (91 kg)	Jr	Waukegan, Illinois
F	1	Isiah Small	6 ft 8 in (2.03 m)	170 lb (77 kg)	Jr	Jersey City, New Jersey
G	2	Caleb Asberry	6 ft 3 in (1.91 m)	170 lb (77 kg)	So	Pflugerville, Texas
F	3	Chandler Davis	6 ft 8 in (2.03 m)	235 lb (107 kg)	Sr	Conyers, Georgia
G	4	Shelby Adams	6 ft 3 in (1.91 m)	175 lb (79 kg)	Jr	Converse, Texas
G	5	Marlin Davis	6 ft 2 in (1.88 m)	165 lb (75 kg)	RS Jr	Houston, Texas
G	10	Drew Tennial	6 ft 5 in (1.96 m)	210 lb (95 kg)	Fr	Edmond, Oklahoma
G	11	Ryan Bormann	5 ft 10 in (1.78 m)	165 lb (75 kg)	Fr	Austin, Texas
G	12	Mason Harrell	5 ft 9 in (1.75 m)	145 lb (66 kg)	So	Midwest City, Oklahoma
F	14	Quentin Scott	6 ft 7 in (2.01 m)	215 lb (98 kg)	Jr	Houma, Louisiana
G	21	Garrett Shaw	6 ft 4 in (1.93 m)	200 lb (91 kg)	Jr	Mansfield, Texas
G	22	Nijal Pearson	6 ft 5 in (1.96 m)	200 lb (91 kg)	Sr	Beaumont, Texas
F	25	Alonzo Sule	6 ft 7 in (2.01 m)	200 lb (91 kg)	RS So	Houston, Texas
F	45	Eric Terry	6 ft 8 in (2.03 m)	230 lb (104 kg)	Sr	Houston, Texas

Head coach

- Danny Kaspar (North Texas)

Assistant coach(es)

- Jim Shaw (Grinnell)
- Terrence Johnson (Southern)
- Robert Guster (Missouri–Rolla)

Legend

- (C) Team captain
- (S) Suspended
- (I) Ineligible
- (W) Walk-on
- Injured
- Current redshirt

Roster
Last update: December 19, 2019

== Schedule and results ==
Date time, TV	Rank^{#}	Opponent^{#}	Result	Record	Site (attendance) city, state
Exhibition
November 1, 2019*; 7:00 pm, ESPN+		Cameron	W 91–54		Strahan Arena (1,256); San Marcos, TX
Non-conference regular season
November 5, 2019*; 7:30 pm, ESPN+		Texas Lutheran	W 103–45	1–0	Strahan Arena (2,752); San Marcos, TX
November 9, 2019*; 3:00 pm		at Air Force	L 71–78	1–1	Clune Arena (1,526); Colorado Springs, CO
November 12, 2019*; 7:00 pm, ESPN+		Prairie View A&M	W 75–48	2–1	Strahan Arena (2,889); San Marcos, TX
November 15, 2019*; 8:00 pm, ESPN+		at No. 24 Baylor	L 63–72	2–2	Ferrell Center (7,640); Waco, TX
November 18, 2019*; 7:00 pm, ESPN+		Jackson State; Southwestern Showdown	W 73–58	3–2	Strahan Arena (1,645); San Marcos, TX
November 20, 2019*; 9:00 pm		at UNLV; Southwestern Showdown	W 64–57	4–2	Thomas & Mack Center (7,067); Paradise, NV
November 25, 2019*; 7:00 pm, ESPN+		Abilene Christian; Southwestern Showdown	W 61–56	5–2	Strahan Arena (1,533); San Marcos, TX
November 30, 2019*; 4:30 pm, ESPN+		Hartford; Southwestern Showdown	W 69–55	6–2	Strahan Arena (1,427); San Marcos, TX
December 4, 2019*; 7:00 pm, ESPN3		at Houston	L 60–68	6–3	Fertitta Center (6,461); Houston, TX
December 7, 2019*; 4:00 pm, ESPN+		UTSA; I-35 Rivalry	L 71–77	6–4	Strahan Arena (2,463); San Marcos, TX
December 15, 2019*; 5:00 pm, ESPN+		Bethany	W 117–65	7–4	Strahan Arena (1,202); San Marcos, TX
Sun Belt Conference regular season
December 19, 2019; 6:00 pm, ESPN+		at Georgia Southern	L 64–67	7–5 (0–1)	Hanner Fieldhouse (1,002); Statesboro, GA
December 21, 2019; 12:00 pm, ESPN+		at Georgia State	L 69–81	7–6 (0–2)	GSU Sports Arena (1,531); Atlanta, GA
January 2, 2020; 6:30 pm, ESPN+		at Little Rock	L 68–72	7–7 (0–3)	Jack Stephens Center (1,082); Little Rock, AR
January 4, 2020; 2:00 pm, ESPN+		at Arkansas State	W 70–67	8–7 (1–3)	First National Bank Arena (1,275); Jonesboro, AR
January 6, 2020; 7:00 pm, ESPN+		Troy	L 63–71	8–8 (1–4)	Strahan Arena (1,183); San Marcos, TX
January 9, 2020; 7:00 pm, ESPN+		Coastal Carolina	W 78–64	9–8 (2–4)	Strahan Arena (1,153); San Marcos, TX
January 11, 2020; 4:00 pm, ESPN+		Appalachian State	W 82–57	10–8 (3–4)	Strahan Arena (1,284); San Marcos, TX
January 16, 2020; 7:00 pm, ESPN+		at Louisiana–Monroe	W 64–63	11–8 (4–4)	Fant–Ewing Coliseum (3,332); Monroe, LA
January 18, 2020; 7:00 pm, ESPN+		at Louisiana	W 68–59	12–8 (5–4)	Cajundome (3,649); Lafayette, LA
January 25, 2020; 4:00 pm, ESPN+		UT Arlington	L 62–64	12–9 (5–5)	Strahan Arena (4,084); San Marcos, TX
January 30, 2020; 7:00 pm, ESPN+		Louisiana–Monroe	W 71–51	13–9 (6–5)	Strahan Arena (2,143); San Marcos, TX
February 1, 2020; 4:30 pm, ESPN+		Louisiana	W 71–66	14–9 (7–5)	Strahan Arena (2,703); San Marcos, TX
February 6, 2020; 6:00 pm, ESPN+		at Coastal Carolina	W 100–63	15–9 (8–5)	HTC Center (1,497); Conway, SC
February 8, 2020; 3:00 pm, ESPN+		at Appalachian State	L 57–60	15–10 (8–6)	Holmes Center (2,164); Boone, NC
February 13, 2020; 7:00 pm, ESPN+		Little Rock	W 74–66	16–10 (9–6)	Strahan Arena (1,543); San Marcos, TX
February 15, 2020; 2:00 pm, ESPN+		Arkansas State	W 69–64	17–10 (10–6)	Strahan Arena (1,706); San Marcos, TX
February 20, 2020; 7:00 pm, ESPN+		Georgia Southern	W 70–55	18–10 (11–6)	Strahan Arena (2,387); San Marcos, TX
February 22, 2020; 4:00 pm, ESPN+		Georgia State	W 86–76	19–10 (12–6)	Strahan Arena (2,718); San Marcos, TX
February 28, 2020; 8:00 pm, ESPN2		at UT Arlington	W 87–85 ^{3OT}	20–10 (13–6)	College Park Center (3,309); Arlington, TX
March 3, 2020; 7:00 pm, ESPN+		at South Alabama	L 54–58	20–11 (13–7)	Mitchell Center (3,319); Mobile, AL
Sun Belt tournament
March 11, 2020; 7:00 pm, ESPN+	(3)	(6) Appalachian State; Quarterfinals	W 85–68	21–11	Strahan Arena (6,308); San Marcos, TX
March 14, 2020; 2:00 pm, ESPN+	(3)	vs. (2) South Alabama; Semifinals	Cancelled due to the COVID-19 pandemic		Smoothie King Center; New Orleans, LA
*Non-conference game. ^{#}Rankings from AP Poll. (#) Tournament seedings in parentheses. All times are in Central.
