= 2019–20 South Alabama Jaguars men's basketball team =

American college basketball season

2019–20 South Alabama Jaguars men's basketball
- Conference: Sun Belt Conference
- Record: 20–11 (13–7 Sun Belt)
- Head coach: Richie Riley (2nd season)
- Assistant coaches: Adam Howard; Amorrow Morgan; Tyler Parker
- Home arena: Mitchell Center

2019–20 Sun Belt Conference men's basketball standings
	Conf.				Overall
Team	W		L	PCT	W		L	PCT
Little Rock	15	–	5	.750	21	–	10	.677
South Alabama	13	–	7	.650	20	–	11	.645
Texas State	13	–	7	.650	21	–	11	.656
Georgia State	12	–	8	.600	19	–	13	.594
Georgia Southern	12	–	8	.600	20	–	13	.606
Appalachian State	11	–	9	.550	18	–	15	.545
UT Arlington	10	–	10	.500	14	–	18	.438
Louisiana	8	–	12	.400	14	–	19	.424
Arkansas State	8	–	12	.400	16	–	16	.500
Coastal Carolina	8	–	12	.400	16	–	17	.485
Louisiana–Monroe	5	–	15	.250	9	–	20	.310
Troy	5	–	15	.250	9	–	22	.290
Note: The 2020 Sun Belt Tournament was canceled after the quarterfinals due to the COVID-19 pandemic.

The 2019–20 South Alabama Jaguars men's basketball team represented the University of South Alabama during the 2019–20 NCAA Division I men's basketball season. The Jaguars were led by second-year head coach Richie Riley and played their home games at the Mitchell Center in Mobile, Alabama as members in the Sun Belt Conference. They finished the season 20–11, 13–7 in Sun Belt play to finish in a tie for second place. They were set to be the No. 2 seed in the Sun Belt tournament, however, the tournament was cancelled amid the COVID-19 pandemic.

== Previous season ==
The Jaguars finished the 2018–19 season 17–17, 8–10 in Sun Belt play to finish in eight place. They lost to Texas State in the quarterfinals of the Sun Belt tournament.

== Off-season ==
=== Departures ===
Name	Pos.	Height	Weight	Year	Hometown	Notes
Kory Holden	G	6'2"	185	RS Senior	Salisbury, Maryland	Graduated.
Tashombe Riley	F	6’7"	210	RS Senior	Orangeburg, South Carolina	Graduated.
R.J. Kelly	F	6'7"	205	RS Sophomore	Powder Springs, Georgia	Transferred to Talladega College.
Rodrick Sikes	G	6'2"	170	Senior	Ocean Springs, Mississippi	Graduated.
Jordan Andrews	G	6’5”	180	RS Junior	Abita Springs, Louisiana	Transferred to Texas Southern.
Abdul Dial	G	6’3”	200	Junior	West Palm Beach, Florida	Transferred to Georgia Southwestern College.

=== Incoming transfers ===
Name	Number	Pos.	Height	Weight	Year	Hometown	Previous School
Chad Lott	21	G	6'4"	200	RS Junior	Shreveport, Louisiana	Transferred from Howard. Lott will play immediately in the 2019–20 season. Will have one year of remaining eligibility left.
Deaundrae Ballard		F	6'5"	181	Junior	Atlanta, Georgia	Transferred from Florida. Under NCAA transfer rules, Ballard will have to sit out for the 2019–20 season. Will have two year of remaining eligibility.
Sam Iorio		F	6'7"	221	Junior	Allentown, Pennsylvania	Transferred from American. Under NCAA transfer rules, Iorio will have to sit out for the 2018–19 season. Will have two year of remaining eligibility.

== Roster ==
2019–20 South Alabama Jaguars men's basketball team
Players
Coaches

Pos.	#	Name	Height	Weight	Year	Previous school	Hometown
F	0	K.K Curry	6 ft 6 in (1.98 m)	195 lb (88 kg)	Fr	Cleveland High School	Cleveland, Tennessee
G	1	Herb McGee	6 ft 1 in (1.85 m)	198 lb (90 kg)	Sr	Riverside Academy	Reserve, Louisiana
F	3	Kevin Morris	6 ft 8 in (2.03 m)	265 lb (120 kg)	Sr	Dothan High School	Dothan, Alabama
G	4	Tyreke Locure	6 ft 0 in (1.83 m)	165 lb (75 kg)	Fr	North High School	New Orleans, Louisiana
G	14	Adam Sizemore	5 ft 9 in (1.75 m)	160 lb (73 kg)	Fr	North Laurel HS	London, Kentucky
G	21	Chad Lott	6 ft 4 in (1.93 m)	200 lb (91 kg)	GS	Howard	Shreveport, Louisiana
G	22	Andre Fox	6 ft 4 in (1.93 m)	184 lb (83 kg)	Sr	High Point	Greenbelt, Maryland
G	25	Don Coleman	6 ft 2 in (1.88 m)	190 lb (86 kg)	Sr	California	Augusta, Georgia
G	30	A.C. Kelly	6 ft 6 in (1.98 m)	190 lb (86 kg)	Fr	Parkland High School	Allentown, Pennsylvania
F	32	Josh Ayeni	6 ft 8 in (2.03 m)	212 lb (96 kg)	Jr	St. Bonaventure	Zaria, Nigeria
F	33	Josh Ajayi	6 ft 6 in (1.98 m)	229 lb (104 kg)	RS Sr	San Gabriel Academy	El Monte, California
F	42	Trhae Mitchell	6 ft 6 in (1.98 m)	196 lb (89 kg)	RS Sr	Pebblebrook High School	Austell, Georgia
G	50	John Pettway	6 ft 3 in (1.91 m)	180 lb (82 kg)	RS Jr	Keith High School	Safford, Alabama
F		Deaundrae Ballard (redshirt)	6 ft 5 in (1.96 m)	181 lb (82 kg)	Jr	Florida	Atlanta, Georgia
G		Sam Iorio (redshirt)	6 ft 7 in (2.01 m)	221 lb (100 kg)	Jr	American	Allentown, Pennsylvania

Head coach

- Richie Riley (Eastern Kentucky)

Assistant coach(es)

- Adam Howard (Western Kentucky)
- Amorrow Morgan (Idaho State)
- Tyler Parker (Faulkner University)
- Mikel Kosich (Montana State University-Billings)

Legend

- (C) Team captain
- (S) Suspended
- (I) Ineligible
- (W) Walk-on
- Injured
- Current redshirt

Roster
Last update: January 16, 2020

== Schedule and results ==
Date time, TV	Rank^{#}	Opponent^{#}	Result	Record	High points	High rebounds	High assists	Site (attendance) city, state
Exhibition
Oct 27, 2019*; 3:00 pm		at Mississippi State; Mississippi flooding relief	L 75-78	–	30 – Fox	5 – Lott	5 – Lott	Humphrey Coliseum (1,515); Starkville, MS
Regular season
Nov 6, 2019*; 7:00 pm, ESPN+		Pikeville	W 82–51	1–0	18 – Lott	13 – Ajayi	6 – Locure	Mitchell Center (1,402); Mobile, AL
Nov 9, 2019*; 7:00 pm, ESPN+		Southern Miss	W 75–69	2–0	30 – Ajayi	7 – Ajayi	3 – Tied	Mitchell Center (1,893); Mobile, AL
Nov 12, 2019*; 7:00 pm, ESPN+		No. 22 Auburn	L 69–70	2–1	23 – Fox	10 – Fox	4 – Mitchell	Mitchell Center (10,068); Mobile, AL
Nov 15, 2019*; 6:00 pm		at Chattanooga	L 72–90	2–2	24 – Fox	6 – Mitchell	3 – Fox	McKenzie Arena (2,589); Chattanooga, TN
Nov 19, 2019*; 7:00 pm, ESPN+		Spring Hill	W 98–72	3–2	21 – Ajayi	10 – Ajayi	5 – Tied	Mitchell Center (1,374); Mobile, AL
Nov 25, 2019*; 10:00 am, FloHoops		vs. Northeastern; Gulf Coast Showcase first round	W 74–62	4–2	19 – Lott	10 – Ajayi	3 – McGee	Hertz Arena (346); Estero, FL
Nov 26, 2019*; 4:00 pm, FloHoops		at Miami (OH); Gulf Coast Showcase semifinals	W 82–71	5–2	21 – Ajayi	10 – Lott	3 – Tied	Hertz Arena (578); Estero, FL
Nov 27, 2019*; 6:30 pm, FloHoops		La Salle; Gulf Coast Showcase championship	L 76–81 ^{OT}	5–3	28 – Fox	8 – Ajayi	3 – Tied	Hertz Arena (413); Estero, FL
Dec 8, 2019*; 1:00 pm, ESPN+		at Richmond	L 57–75	5–4	12 – Tied	9 – Lott	4 – Mitchell	Robins Center (5,056); Richmond, VA
Dec 17, 2019*; 7:00 pm, ESPN+		Alabama A&M	W 89–79	6–4	24 – Ajayi	8 – McGee	6 – McGee	Mitchell Center (1,540); Mobile, AL
Dec 19, 2019; 7:00 pm, ESPN+		Appalachian State	L 71–81	6–5 (0–1)	24 – Fox	7 – Ajayi	4 – McGee	Mitchell Center (1,285); Mobile, AL
Dec 21, 2019*; 3:00 pm, ESPN+		Coastal Carolina	L 69–81	6–6 (0–2)	19 – Lott	10 – Mitchell	5 – Mitchell	Mitchell Center (1,122); Mobile, AL
Dec 28, 2019*; 3:00 pm, ESPN+		Mobile	W 76–47	7–6	16 – Lott	6 – Mitchell	5 – Tied	Mitchell Center (1,118); Mobile, AL
Jan 2, 2020; 7:00 pm, ESPN+		at Louisiana	W 60–57	8–6 (1–2)	14 – Fox	12 – Ajayi	2 – Mitchell	Cajundome (3,256); Lafayette, LA
Jan 4, 2020; 2:00 pm, ESPN+		at Louisiana–Monroe	L 49–69	8–7 (1–3)	13 – Lott	7 – Ajayi	2 – Tied	Fant–Ewing Coliseum (1,411); Monroe, LA
Jan 6, 2020; 7:00 pm, ESPN+		at UT Arlington	W 66–54	9–7 (2–3)	20 – Lott	13 – Ajayi	6 – McGee	College Park Center (1,282); Arlington, TX
Jan 9, 2020; 7:00 pm, ESPN+		Arkansas State	W 75–59	10–7 (3–3)	20 – Ajayi	11 – Ajayi	3 – Tied	Mitchell Center (1,392); Mobile, AL
Jan 11, 2020; 4:30 pm, ESPN+		at Little Rock	W 52–43	11–7 (4–3)	14 – Lott	9 – Ajayi	2 – Tied	Jack Stephens Center (2,525); Little Rock, AR
Jan 16, 2020; 7:00 pm, ESPN+		Georgia State	L 63–72	11–8 (4–4)	19 – Ajayi	10 – Ajayi	2 – Tied	Mitchell Center (1,744); Mobile, AL
Jan 18, 2020; 3:00 pm, ESPN+		Georgia Southern	W 74–68	12–8 (5–4)	24 – Ajayi	10 – Mitchell	2 – Tied	Mitchell Center (2,093); Mobile, AL
Jan 23, 2020; 7:00 pm, ESPN+		at Arkansas State	L 71–75	12–9 (5–5)	23 – Ajayi	9 – Ajayi	2 – McGee	First National Bank Arena (3,119); Jonesboro, AR
Jan 25, 2020; 3:00 pm, ESPN+		Little Rock	L 71–73	12–10 (5–6)	17 – 3 tied	6 – Mitchell	3 – 3 tied	Mitchell Center (1,934); Mobile, AL
Jan 30, 2020; 6:00 pm, ESPN+		at Georgia State	L 73–76	12–11 (5–7)	20 – Fox	6 – Ajayi	4 – Locure	GSU Sports Arena (1,829); Atlanta, GA
Feb 1, 2020; 3:00 pm, ESPN+		at Georgia Southern	W 79–69	13–11 (6–7)	22 – Mitchell	8 – Tied	5 – Mitchell	Hanner Fieldhouse (1,635); Statesboro, GA
Feb 7, 2020; 8:00 pm, ESPN2		at Troy	W 70–66	14–11 (7–7)	20 – Ajayi	10 – Ajayi	5 – McGee	Trojan Arena (4,523); Troy, AL
Feb 13, 2020; 7:00 pm, ESPN+		Louisiana	W 78–75	15–11 (8–7)	20 – Tied	10 – Lott	5 – Mitchell	Mitchell Center (1,342); Mobile, AL
Feb 15, 2020; 3:00 pm, ESPN+		Louisiana–Monroe	W 50–49	16–11 (9–7)	14 – Mitchell	11 – Mitchell	3 – 3 tied	Mitchell Center (1,482); Mobile, AL
Feb 20, 2020; 6:00 pm, ESPN+		at Appalachian State	W 78–70	17–11 (10–7)	19 – Ajayi	8 – Lott	6 – Pettway	Holmes Center (1,212); Boone, NC
Feb 22, 2020; 1:00 pm, ESPN+		at Coastal Carolina	W 74–71	18–11 (11–7)	22 – Lott	8 – Lott	4 – Fox	HTC Center (1,127); Conway, SC
Feb 29, 2020; 6:00 pm, ESPN+		Troy	W 78–63	19–11 (12–7)	22 – Lott	6 – Lott	4 – Tied	Mitchell Center (4,219); Mobile, AL
Mar 3, 2020; 7:00 pm, ESPN+		Texas State	W 58–54	20–11 (13–7)	16 – Lott	12 – Mitchell	3 – Mitchell	Mitchell Center (3,319); Mobile, AL
Sun Belt tournament
Mar 14, 2020; 2:00 pm, ESPN+	(2)	vs. (3) Texas State; Semifinals	Cancelled due to the COVID-19 pandemic					Smoothie King Center; New Orleans, LA
*Non-conference game. ^{#}Rankings from AP Poll. (#) Tournament seedings in parentheses. All times are in Central Time.

== See also ==
- 2019–20 South Alabama Jaguars women's basketball team
