= 2019–20 Georgia Southern Eagles men's basketball team =

American college basketball season

2019–20 Georgia Southern Eagles men's basketball
- Conference: Sun Belt Conference
- Record: 20–13 (12–8 Sun Belt)
- Head coach: Mark Byington (7th season)
- Associate head coach: Andrew Wilson
- Assistant coaches: Ben Betts; Jon Cremins
- Home arena: Hanner Fieldhouse

2019–20 Sun Belt Conference men's basketball standings
	Conf.				Overall
Team	W		L	PCT	W		L	PCT
Little Rock	15	–	5	.750	21	–	10	.677
South Alabama	13	–	7	.650	20	–	11	.645
Texas State	13	–	7	.650	21	–	11	.656
Georgia State	12	–	8	.600	19	–	13	.594
Georgia Southern	12	–	8	.600	20	–	13	.606
Appalachian State	11	–	9	.550	18	–	15	.545
UT Arlington	10	–	10	.500	14	–	18	.438
Louisiana	8	–	12	.400	14	–	19	.424
Arkansas State	8	–	12	.400	16	–	16	.500
Coastal Carolina	8	–	12	.400	16	–	17	.485
Louisiana–Monroe	5	–	15	.250	9	–	20	.310
Troy	5	–	15	.250	9	–	22	.290
Note: The 2020 Sun Belt Tournament was canceled after the quarterfinals due to the COVID-19 pandemic.

The 2019–20 Georgia Southern Eagles men's basketball team represented Georgia Southern University in the 2019–20 NCAA Division I men's basketball season. The Eagles, led by seventh-year head coach Mark Byington, played their home games at Hanner Fieldhouse in Statesboro, Georgia as members of the Sun Belt Conference. They finished the season 20–13, 12–8 in Sun Belt play to finish in a tie for fourth place. They were the No. 5 seed in the Sun Belt tournament, where they defeated Louisiana and Georgia State. However, the tournament was later cancelled amid the COVID-19 pandemic.

On March 20, head coach Mark Byington resigned to become the head coach at James Madison. He finished at Georgia Southern with a seven-year record of 131–97.

== Previous season ==
The Eagles finished the 2018–19 season 21–12, 12–6 in Sun Belt play to finish in a 3-way tie for second place. They defeated Louisiana–Monroe in the quarterfinals of the Sun Belt tournament, before losing in the semifinals to UT Arlington. Despite having 21 wins, they did not participate in a postseason tournament.

== Roster ==
2019–20 Georgia Southern Eagles men's basketball team
Players
Coaches

Pos.	#	Name	Height	Weight	Year	Hometown
G	0	Trevion Lamar	6 ft 5 in (1.96 m)	210 lb (95 kg)	Jr	Savannah, Georgia
G/F	1	David Viti	6 ft 5 in (1.96 m)	205 lb (93 kg)	RS Fr	Buford, Georgia
G	2	Elijah McCadden	6 ft 4 in (1.93 m)	192 lb (87 kg)	So	Rocky Mount, North Carolina
G	3	Ike Smith	6 ft 4 in (1.93 m)	210 lb (95 kg)	RS Sr	Gainesville, Florida
G	4	Jalen Cincore	6 ft 5 in (1.96 m)	180 lb (82 kg)	Fr	Memphis, Tennessee
F/C	5	Trey Dawkins	6 ft 9 in (2.06 m)	200 lb (91 kg)	Sr	Forest City, North Carolina
G	10	Calvin Wishart	6 ft 2 in (1.88 m)	180 lb (82 kg)	So	Delano, Minnesota
F	11	Mackenzie McFatten	6 ft 8 in (2.03 m)	190 lb (86 kg)	Fr	Douglas, Georgia
F	12	Ralueke Orizu	6 ft 9 in (2.06 m)	190 lb (86 kg)	RS So	Atlanta, Georgia
G	13	Quan Jackson	6 ft 4 in (1.93 m)	180 lb (82 kg)	RS Jr	Tallahassee, Florida
G	14	Will Dillard	6 ft 3 in (1.91 m)	205 lb (93 kg)	RS Fr	Greensboro, North Carolina
G	21	Eito Yuminami	5 ft 6 in (1.68 m)	140 lb (64 kg)	So	Mooresville, North Carolina
F	23	Simeon Carter	6 ft 8 in (2.03 m)	215 lb (98 kg)	RS Sr	Charlotte, North Carolina
G	24	David-Lee Jones Jr.	6 ft 0 in (1.83 m)	175 lb (79 kg)	Sr	Tampa, Florida
F	30	Jordan Walker	6 ft 7 in (2.01 m)	180 lb (82 kg)	Sr	Richmond Hill, Georgia
G	34	Jacob Sowers	6 ft 0 in (1.83 m)	185 lb (84 kg)	Jr	Alpharetta, Georgia
F	53	Isaiah Crawley	6 ft 7 in (2.01 m)	210 lb (95 kg)	Sr	Ripley, Tennessee

Head coach

- Mark Byington (UNC Wilmington)

Assistant coach(es)

- Andrew Wilson (Florida State)
- Ben Betts (Roanoke)
- Jon Cremins (Valdosta State)

Legend

- (C) Team captain
- (S) Suspended
- (I) Ineligible
- (W) Walk-on
- Injured
- Current redshirt

Roster
Last update: December 21, 2019

== Schedule and results ==
Date time, TV	Rank^{#}	Opponent^{#}	Result	Record	Site (attendance) city, state
Regular season
November 5, 2019*; 9:00 pm, SECN		at No. 24 Auburn	L 74–83	0–1	Auburn Arena (8,702); Auburn, AL
November 8, 2019*; 8:00 pm, TrueBlue Live		Reinhardt	W 109–55	1–1	Hanner Fieldhouse (2,156); Statesboro, GA
November 11, 2019*; 7:00 pm, ESPN+		at North Florida	L 77–80	1–2	UNF Arena (1,659); Jacksonville, FL
November 15, 2019*; 7:00 pm, ESPN+		Radford	W 76–73	2–2	Hanner Fieldhouse (1,599); Statesboro, GA
November 19, 2019*; 7:00 pm, ESPN+		Mercer	W 98–88	3–2	Hanner Fieldhouse (1,421); Statesboro, GA
November 29, 2019*; 4:30 pm		vs. Campbell; FGCU Classic	W 84–74	4–2	Alico Arena (277); Fort Myers, FL
November 30, 2019*; 4:30 pm		vs. North Dakota; FGCU Classic	L 68–80	4–3	Alico Arena (376); Fort Myers, FL
December 1, 2019*; 5:00 pm, ESPN+		at Florida Gulf Coast; FGCU Classic	W 72–57	5–3	Alico Arena (2,031); Fort Myers, FL
December 6, 2019*; 7:00 pm, ESPN+		Carver	W 100–70	6–3	Hanner Fieldhouse (1,213); Statesboro, GA
December 15, 2019*; 5:00 pm, ESPN3		at Bradley	L 51–81	6–4	Carver Arena (4,904); Peoria, IL
December 19, 2019; 7:00 pm, ESPN+		Texas State	W 67–64	7–4 (1–0)	Hanner Fieldhouse (1,002); Statesboro, GA
December 21, 2019; 1:00 pm, ESPN+		UT Arlington	W 77–74	8–4 (2–0)	Hanner Fieldhouse (676); Statesboro, GA
December 23, 2019*; 7:00 pm, SECN		at Georgia	L 64–73	8–5	Stegeman Coliseum (10,412); Athens, GA
January 2, 2020; 7:00 pm, ESPN+		at Coastal Carolina	W 70–67	9–5 (3–0)	HTC Center (811); Conway, SC
January 4, 2020; 4:00 pm, ESPN+		at Appalachian State	L 72–74	9–6 (3–1)	Holmes Center (1,630); Boone, NC
January 6, 2020; 7:30 pm, ESPN+		at Little Rock	L 73–79	9–7 (3–2)	Jack Stephens Center (1,188); Little Rock, AR
January 9, 2020; 7:00 pm, ESPN+		Louisiana–Monroe	W 67–56	10–7 (4–2)	Hanner Fieldhouse (940); Statesboro, GA
January 11, 2020; 4:00 pm, ESPN+		Louisiana	W 71–51	11–7 (5–2)	Hanner Fieldhouse (1,493); Statesboro, GA
January 16, 2020; 7:00 pm, ESPN+		at Troy	W 82–66	12–7 (6–2)	Trojan Arena (2,673); Troy, AL
January 18, 2020; 4:00 pm, ESPN+		at South Alabama	L 68–74	12–8 (6–3)	Mitchell Center (2,093); Mobile, AL
January 25, 2020; 5:00 pm, ESPN+		Georgia State	L 77–82	12–9 (6–4)	Hanner Fieldhouse (3,897); Statesboro, GA
January 30, 2020; 7:00 pm, ESPN+		Troy	W 86–57	13–9 (7–4)	Hanner Fieldhouse (1,035); Statesboro, GA
February 1, 2020; 4:00 pm, ESPN+		South Alabama	L 69–79	13–10 (7–5)	Hanner Fieldhouse (1,635); Statesboro, GA
February 6, 2020; 8:00 pm, ESPN+		at Louisiana–Monroe	W 67–65	14–10 (8–5)	Fant–Ewing Coliseum (1,506); Monroe, LA
February 8, 2020; 8:00 pm, ESPN+		at Louisiana	W 86–79	15–10 (9–5)	Cajundome (3,876); Lafayette, LA
February 13, 2020; 7:00 pm, ESPN+		Coastal Carolina	W 79–69	16–10 (10–5)	Hanner Fieldhouse (1,177); Statesboro, GA
February 15, 2020; 4:00 pm, ESPN+		Appalachian State	L 57–62	16–11 (10–6)	Hanner Fieldhouse (1,753); Statesboro, GA
February 20, 2020; 8:00 pm, ESPN+		at Texas State	L 55–70	16–12 (10–7)	Strahan Arena (2,387); San Marcos, TX
February 22, 2020; 3:00 pm, ESPN+		at UT Arlington	W 81–61	17–12 (11–7)	College Park Center (1,875); Arlington, TX
February 28, 2020; 7:00 pm, ESPN+		at Georgia State	W 79–70	18–12 (12–7)	GSU Sports Arena (3,854); Atlanta, GA
March 3, 2020; 7:00 pm, ESPN+		Arkansas State	L 75–76	18–13 (12–8)	Hanner Fieldhouse (1,217); Statesboro, GA
Sun Belt tournament
March 9, 2020; 6:00 pm, ESPN+	(5)	(8) Louisiana; Second round	W 82–81	19–13	Hanner Fieldhouse (1,244); Statesboro, GA
March 11, 2020; 6:00 pm, ESPN+	(5)	at (4) Georgia State; Quarterfinals/Modern Day Hate	W 81–62	20–13	GSU Sports Arena (2,843); Atlanta, GA
Mar 14, 2020; 11:30 am, ESPN+	(5)	vs. (1) Little Rock; Semifinals	Cancelled due to the COVID-19 pandemic		Smoothie King Center; New Orleans, LA
*Non-conference game. ^{#}Rankings from AP Poll. (#) Tournament seedings in parentheses. All times are in Eastern.
