= 2019–20 Appalachian State Mountaineers men's basketball team =

American college basketball season

2019–20 Appalachian State Mountaineers men's basketball
- Conference: Sun Belt Conference
- Record: 18–15 (11–9 Sun Belt)
- Head coach: Dustin Kerns (1st season)
- Assistant coaches: Patrick Moynihan; Bob Szorc; Frank Young
- Home arena: George M. Holmes Convocation Center

2019–20 Sun Belt Conference men's basketball standings
	Conf.				Overall
Team	W		L	PCT	W		L	PCT
Little Rock	15	–	5	.750	21	–	10	.677
South Alabama	13	–	7	.650	20	–	11	.645
Texas State	13	–	7	.650	21	–	11	.656
Georgia State	12	–	8	.600	19	–	13	.594
Georgia Southern	12	–	8	.600	20	–	13	.606
Appalachian State	11	–	9	.550	18	–	15	.545
UT Arlington	10	–	10	.500	14	–	18	.438
Louisiana	8	–	12	.400	14	–	19	.424
Arkansas State	8	–	12	.400	16	–	16	.500
Coastal Carolina	8	–	12	.400	16	–	17	.485
Louisiana–Monroe	5	–	15	.250	9	–	20	.310
Troy	5	–	15	.250	9	–	22	.290
Note: The 2020 Sun Belt Tournament was canceled after the quarterfinals due to the COVID-19 pandemic.

The 2019–20 Appalachian State Mountaineers men's basketball team represented Appalachian State University in the 2019–20 NCAA Division I men's basketball season. The Mountaineers, led by first-year head coach Dustin Kerns, played their home games at the George M. Holmes Convocation Center in Boone, North Carolina as members of the Sun Belt Conference. They finished the season 18–15, 11–9 in Sun Belt play to finish in sixth place. They defeated Coastal Carolina in the second round of the Sun Belt tournament before losing in the quarterfinals to Texas State.

== Previous season ==
The Mountaineers finished the 2018–19 season 11–21, 6–12 in Sun Belt play to finish in 10th place. They lost in the first round of the Sun Belt tournament to Louisiana–Monroe.

On March 15, 2019, it was announced that head coach Jim Fox was released from his contract, ending his five-year tenure with the team. On March 28, Presbyterian head coach Dustin Kerns was announced as the team's next head coach.

== Roster ==
2019–20 Appalachian State Mountaineers men's basketball team
Players
Coaches

Pos.	#	Name	Height	Weight	Year	Hometown
F	0	Isaac Johnson	6 ft 9 in (2.06 m)	212 lb (96 kg)	Sr	Charlotte, North Carolina
G	1	Justin Forrest	6 ft 2 in (1.88 m)	195 lb (88 kg)	Jr	Decatur, Georgia
F	2	Kendall Lewis	6 ft 7 in (2.01 m)	180 lb (82 kg)	Fr	Snellville, Georgia
G	4	O'Showen Williams	5 ft 11 in (1.8 m)	190 lb (86 kg)	Sr	Macon, Georgia
G	5	J.C. Tharrington	6 ft 1 in (1.85 m)	165 lb (75 kg)	Fr	Charlotte, North Carolina
G	10	Michael Bibby	6 ft 3 in (1.91 m)	175 lb (79 kg)	RS Jr	Phoenix, Arizona
G/F	11	Donovan Gregory	6 ft 5 in (1.96 m)	190 lb (86 kg)	Fr	Charlotte, North Carolina
G	12	Andrew Muse	6 ft 2 in (1.88 m)	165 lb (75 kg)	Fr	Winston-Salem, North Carolina
G	14	Bryant Greene	6 ft 1 in (1.85 m)	175 lb (79 kg)	Fr	Boone, North Carolina
G	20	Adrian Delph	6 ft 3 in (1.91 m)	185 lb (84 kg)	So	Kings Mountain, North Carolina
F	21	James Lewis Jr.	6 ft 8 in (2.03 m)	215 lb (98 kg)	RS So	Mount Holly, North Carolina
F	24	R.J. Wilson	6 ft 6 in (1.98 m)	240 lb (109 kg)	Fr	Raleigh, North Carolina
G	30	Jamie Baker	5 ft 11 in (1.8 m)	160 lb (73 kg)	Jr	Concord, North Carolina
F	50	Hunter Seacat	6 ft 9 in (2.06 m)	235 lb (107 kg)	RS Sr	Mooresville, North Carolina

Head coach

- Dustin Kerns (Clemson)

Assistant coach(es)

- Patrick Moynihan (North Georgia)
- Bob Szorc (St. John's)
- Frank Young (West Virginia)

Legend

- (C) Team captain
- (S) Suspended
- (I) Ineligible
- (W) Walk-on
- Injured
- Current redshirt

Roster
Last update: December 19, 2019

== Schedule and results ==
Date time, TV	Rank^{#}	Opponent^{#}	Result	Record	Site (attendance) city, state
Regular season
November 5, 2019*; 7:00 pm, BTN		at Michigan	L 71–79	0–1	Crisler Center (11,325); Ann Arbor, MI
November 7, 2019*; 7:00 pm, ESPN+		Ferrum	W 83–56	1–1	Holmes Center (1,021); Boone, NC
November 12, 2019*; 7:00 pm, ESPN+		East Carolina	W 68–62	2–1	Holmes Center (1,893); Boone, NC
November 15, 2019*; 4:30 pm		vs. Montana State; Spartan Invitational	L 56–59	2–2	Greensboro Coliseum (214); Greensboro, NC
November 16, 2019*; 3:30 pm		vs. Tennessee Tech; Spartan Invitational	W 69–47	3–2	Greensboro Coliseum (212); Greensboro, NC
November 18, 2019*; 7:00 pm, ESPN+		at UNC Greensboro; Spartan Invitational	L 41–55	3–3	Greensboro Coliseum (3,265); Greensboro, NC
November 21, 2019*; 7:00 pm, ESPN+		Charlotte	W 64–55	4–3	Holmes Center (2,203); Boone, NC
November 26, 2019*; 7:00 pm, ESPN+		at East Tennessee State	L 69–78	4–4	Freedom Hall Civic Center (5,126); Johnson City, TN
December 3, 2019*; 7:00 pm, ESPN+		St. Andrews	W 90–58	5–4	Holmes Center (1,032); Boone, NC
December 14, 2019*; 12:00 pm		at Howard	W 81–59	6–4	Burr Gymnasium (924); Washington, D.C.
December 19, 2019; 8:00 pm, ESPN+		at South Alabama	W 81–71	7–4 (1–0)	Mitchell Center (1,285); Mobile, AL
December 21, 2019; 3:00 pm, ESPN+		at Troy	W 70–65	8–4 (2–0)	Trojan Arena (1,349); Troy, AL
December 29, 2019*; 4:00 pm, ACCN		at NC State	L 60–72	8–5	PNC Arena (17,592); Raleigh, NC
January 2, 2020; 7:00 pm, ESPN+		Georgia State	L 60–69	8–6 (2–1)	Holmes Center (1,253); Boone, NC
January 4, 2020; 4:00 pm, ESPN+		Georgia Southern	W 74–72	9–6 (3–1)	Holmes Center (1,630); Boone, NC
January 6, 2020; 7:00 pm, ESPN+		Louisiana	L 73–81	9–7 (3–2)	Holmes Center (907); Boone, NC
January 9, 2020; 8:00 pm, ESPN+		at UT Arlington	L 56–66	9–8 (3–3)	College Park Center (1,272); Arlington, TX
January 11, 2020; 5:00 pm, ESPN+		at Texas State	L 57–82	9–9 (3–4)	Strahan Arena (1,284); San Marcos, TX
January 16, 2020; 7:00 pm, ESPN+		Arkansas State	W 83–80 ^{OT}	10–9 (4–4)	Holmes Center (1,566); Boone, NC
January 18, 2020; 4:30 pm, ESPN+		Little Rock	L 57–73	10–10 (4–4)	Holmes Center (2,753); Boone, NC
January 25, 2020; 2:00 pm, ESPN+		at Coastal Carolina	W 78–58	11–10 (5–5)	HTC Center (1,091); Conway, SC
January 30, 2020; 8:00 pm, ESPN+		at Arkansas State	W 71–64	12–10 (6–5)	First National Bank Arena (1,971); Jonesboro, AR
February 1, 2020; 3:00 pm, ESPN+		at Little Rock	L 86–93	12–11 (6–6)	Jack Stephens Center (1,745); Little Rock, AR
February 6, 2020; 7:00 pm, ESPN+		UT Arlington	W 57–50	13–11 (7–6)	Holmes Center (1,425); Boone, NC
February 8, 2020; 4:00 pm, ESPN+		Texas State	W 60–57	14–11 (8–6)	Holmes Center (2,164); Boone, NC
February 13, 2020; 7:00 pm, ESPN+		at Georgia State	L 65–76	14–12 (8–7)	GSU Sports Arena (2,273); Atlanta, GA
February 15, 2020; 4:00 pm, ESPN+		at Georgia Southern	W 62–57	15–12 (9–7)	Hanner Fieldhouse (1,753); Statesboro, GA
February 20, 2020; 7:00 pm, ESPN+		South Alabama	L 70–78	15–13 (9–8)	Holmes Center (1,212); Boone, NC
February 22, 2020; 4:00 pm, ESPN+		Troy	W 68–59	16–13 (10–8)	Holmes Center (2,137); Boone, NC
February 29, 2020; 4:30 pm, ESPN+		Coastal Carolina	L 77–84	16–14 (10–9)	Holmes Center (3,027); Boone, NC
March 3, 2020; 8:00 pm, ESPN+		at Louisiana–Monroe	W 61–57	17–14 (11–9)	Fant–Ewing Coliseum (1,677); Monroe, LA
Sun Belt tournament
March 9, 2020; 6:00 pm, ESPN+	(6)	(10) Coastal Carolina; Second round	W 70–65	18–14	Holmes Center (1,053); Boone, NC
March 11, 2020; 8:00 pm, ESPN+	(6)	at (3) Texas State; Quarterfinals	L 68–85	18–15	Strahan Arena (6,308); San Marcos, TX
*Non-conference game. ^{#}Rankings from AP Poll. (#) Tournament seedings in parentheses. All times are in Eastern.
