= 2019–20 Troy Trojans men's basketball team =

American college basketball season

2019–20 Troy Trojans men's basketball
- Conference: Sun Belt Conference
- Record: 9–22 (5–15 Sun Belt)
- Head coach: Scott Cross (1st season)
- Assistant coaches: Kenneth Mangrum; Jermaine Johnson; Mike Worley
- Home arena: Trojan Arena (Capacity 6,000)

2019–20 Sun Belt Conference men's basketball standings
	Conf.				Overall
Team	W		L	PCT	W		L	PCT
Little Rock	15	–	5	.750	21	–	10	.677
South Alabama	13	–	7	.650	20	–	11	.645
Texas State	13	–	7	.650	21	–	11	.656
Georgia State	12	–	8	.600	19	–	13	.594
Georgia Southern	12	–	8	.600	20	–	13	.606
Appalachian State	11	–	9	.550	18	–	15	.545
UT Arlington	10	–	10	.500	14	–	18	.438
Louisiana	8	–	12	.400	14	–	19	.424
Arkansas State	8	–	12	.400	16	–	16	.500
Coastal Carolina	8	–	12	.400	16	–	17	.485
Louisiana–Monroe	5	–	15	.250	9	–	20	.310
Troy	5	–	15	.250	9	–	22	.290
Note: The 2020 Sun Belt Tournament was canceled after the quarterfinals due to the COVID-19 pandemic.

The 2019–20 Troy Trojans men's basketball team represented Troy University in the 2019–20 NCAA Division I men's basketball season. The Trojans, led by first-year head coach Scott Cross, played their home games at Trojan Arena in Troy, Alabama as members of the Sun Belt Conference. They finished the season 9–22, 5–15 in Sun Belt play to finish in a tie for 11th place. They failed to qualify for the Sun Belt tournament.

== Previous season ==
The Trojans finished the 2018–19 season 12–18, 5–13 in Sun Belt play to finish in a tie for last place. They failed to qualify for the Sun Belt tournament.

On March 11, 2019, it was announced that head coach Phil Cunningham was relieved of his duties, ending his six-year tenure with the team. On March 26, TCU assistant and former UT Arlington head coach Scott Cross was announced as Troy's next head coach.

== Roster ==
2019–20 Troy Trojans men's basketball team
Players
Coaches

Pos.	#	Name	Height	Weight	Year	Hometown
G	0	Ty Gordon	6 ft 0 in (1.83 m)	200 lb (91 kg)	Jr	Tunica, Mississippi
F	1	Tyrek Williams	6 ft 8 in (2.03 m)	260 lb (118 kg)	Fr	Queens, New York
G	2	KJ Simon	6 ft 3 in (1.91 m)	190 lb (86 kg)	So	Orlando, Florida
G	3	Darian Adams	6 ft 4 in (1.93 m)	200 lb (91 kg)	Jr	Montgomery, Alabama
G	4	Tahj Small	6 ft 4 in (1.93 m)	195 lb (88 kg)	So	Durham, North Carolina
F	10	Zay Williams	6 ft 8 in (2.03 m)	195 lb (88 kg)	So	Birmingham, Alabama
G	11	Desmond Williams	6 ft 1 in (1.85 m)	166 lb (75 kg)	Fr	Montgomery, Alabama
G	12	Charles Norman	6 ft 2 in (1.88 m)	180 lb (82 kg)	Sr	Durham, North Carolina
F	13	Khalyl Waters	6 ft 6 in (1.98 m)	185 lb (84 kg)	Jr	Douglasville, Georgia
G	14	Jakevan Leftridge	6 ft 7 in (2.01 m)	195 lb (88 kg)	Fr	Dallas, Texas
G/F	15	Atakan Sahinkaya	6 ft 5 in (1.96 m)	205 lb (93 kg)	RS So	Istanbul, Turkey
G	20	Jalen Tuck	5 ft 10 in (1.78 m)	185 lb (84 kg)	So	Troy, Alabama
F	24	Nick Stampley	6 ft 6 in (1.98 m)	210 lb (95 kg)	Jr	Broward County, Florida
F	35	Davion Thomas	6 ft 9 in (2.06 m)	210 lb (95 kg)	Jr	Columbus, Georgia

Head coach

- Scott Cross (UT Arlington)

Assistant coach(es)

- Kenneth Mangrum (North Texas)
- Jermaine Johnson (USSA)
- Mike Worley (Denver)

Legend

- (C) Team captain
- (S) Suspended
- (I) Ineligible
- (W) Walk-on
- Injured
- Current redshirt

Roster
Last update: December 24, 2019

== Schedule and results ==
Date time, TV	Opponent	Result	Record	Site (attendance) city, state
Non-conference regular season
November 7, 2019*; 7:00 pm, ESPN+	UAB	L 75–76	0–1	Trojan Arena (5,010); Troy, AL
November 12, 2019*; 7:00 pm, ESPN+	Chattanooga	L 68–74	0–2	Troy Arena (1,917); Troy, AL
November 16, 2019*; 7:00 pm, BTN	at Indiana	L 62–100	0–3	Simon Skjodt Assembly Hall (17,222); Bloomington, IN
November 18, 2019*; 6:00 pm, ESPN+	Carver	W 84–57	1–3	Troy Arena (1,894); Troy, AL
November 20, 2019*; 7:00 pm, SECN+	at Texas A&M	L 52–56	1–4	Reed Arena (5,271); College Station, TX
November 23, 2019*; 2:00 pm, ESPN3	at Samford	L 60–72	1–5	Pete Hanna Center (553); Homewood, AL
November 25, 2019*; 7:00 pm	at Alabama A&M	L 66–80	1–6	Elmore Gymnasium (586); Normal, AL
November 30, 2019*; 2:00 pm, ESPN+	Shorter	W 104–53	2–6	Troy Arena (1,862); Troy, AL
December 4, 2019*; 7:15 pm, ESPN+	North Alabama	W 71–63	3–6	Troy Arena (2,514); Troy, AL
December 11, 2019*; 7:30 pm, ESPN+	at Jacksonville State	W 60–55	4–6	Pete Mathews Coliseum (2,034); Jacksonville, AL
December 15, 2019*; 3:00 pm, ESPN+	at Chattanooga	L 80–84 ^{OT}	4–7	McKenzie Arena (2,261); Chattanooga, TN
Sun Belt Conference regular season
December 19, 2019; 6:00 pm, ESPN+	Coastal Carolina	W 77–59	5–7 (1–0)	Troy Arena (2,005); Troy, AL
December 21, 2019; 2:00 pm, ESPN+	Appalachian State	L 65–70	5–8 (1–1)	Troy Arena (1,349); Troy, AL
January 2, 2020; 7:00 pm, ESPN+	at Louisiana–Monroe	L 63–79	5–9 (1–2)	Fant–Ewing Coliseum (1,547); Monroe, LA
January 4, 2020; 7:00 pm, ESPN+	at Louisiana	L 62–79	5–10 (1–3)	Cajundome (3,467); Lafayette, LA
January 6, 2020; 7:00 pm, ESPN+	at Texas State	W 71–63	6–10 (2–3)	Strahan Arena (1,183); San Marcos, TX
January 9, 2020; 6:00 pm, ESPN+	Little Rock	W 76–71	7–10 (3–3)	Trojan Arena (2,815); Troy, AL
January 11, 2020; 4:00 pm, ESPN+	at Arkansas State	L 68–76 ^{OT}	7–11 (3–4)	First National Bank Arena (1,377); Jonesboro, AR
January 16, 2020; 6:00 pm, ESPN+	Georgia Southern	L 66–82	7–12 (3–5)	Trojan Arena (2,673); Troy, AL
January 18, 2020; 2:00 pm, ESPN+	Georgia State	W 75–65	8–12 (4–5)	Trojan Arena (2,282); Troy, AL
January 22, 2020; 6:30 pm, ESPN+	at Little Rock	L 63–81	8–13 (4–6)	Jack Stephens Center (1,051); Little Rock, AR
January 25, 2020; 4:15 pm, ESPN+	Arkansas State	L 62–78	8–14 (4–7)	Trojan Arena (2,538); Troy, AL
January 30, 2020; 6:00 pm, ESPN+	at Georgia Southern	L 57–86	8–15 (4–8)	Hanner Fieldhouse (1,035); Statesboro, GA
February 1, 2020; 1:00 pm, ESPN+	at Georgia State	W 84–78	9–15 (5–8)	GSU Sports Arena (2,543); Atlanta, GA
February 7, 2020; 8:00 pm, ESPN2	South Alabama	L 66–70	9–16 (5–9)	Trojan Arena (4,523); Troy, AL
February 13, 2020; 6:00 pm, ESPN+	Louisiana–Monroe	L 71–74	9–17 (5–10)	Trojan Arena (2,222); Troy, AL
February 15, 2020; 6:00 pm, ESPN+	Louisiana	L 77–81	9–18 (5–11)	Trojan Arena (2,327); Troy, AL
February 20, 2020; 6:00 pm, ESPN+	at Coastal Carolina	L 60–90	9–19 (5–12)	HTC Center (1,111); Conway, SC
February 22, 2020; 3:00 pm, ESPN+	at Appalachian State	L 59–68	9–20 (5–13)	Holmes Center (2,137); Boone, NC
February 29, 2020; 6:00 pm, ESPN+	at South Alabama	L 63–78	9–21 (5–14)	Mitchell Center (4,219); Mobile, AL
March 3, 2020; 6:00 pm, ESPN+	UT Arlington	L 64–78	9–22 (5–15)	Trojan Arena (3,006); Troy, AL
*Non-conference game. ^{#}Rankings from AP Poll. (#) Tournament seedings in parentheses. All times are in Central.
