= 2019–20 Arkansas State Red Wolves men's basketball team =

American college basketball season

2019–20 Arkansas State Red Wolves men's basketball
- Conference: Sun Belt Conference
- Record: 16–16 (8–12 Sun Belt)
- Head coach: Mike Balado (3rd season)
- Assistant coaches: Rick Cabrera; Mike Scutero; Casey Stanley
- Home arena: First National Bank Arena

2019–20 Sun Belt Conference men's basketball standings
	Conf.				Overall
Team	W		L	PCT	W		L	PCT
Little Rock	15	–	5	.750	21	–	10	.677
South Alabama	13	–	7	.650	20	–	11	.645
Texas State	13	–	7	.650	21	–	11	.656
Georgia State	12	–	8	.600	19	–	13	.594
Georgia Southern	12	–	8	.600	20	–	13	.606
Appalachian State	11	–	9	.550	18	–	15	.545
UT Arlington	10	–	10	.500	14	–	18	.438
Louisiana	8	–	12	.400	14	–	19	.424
Arkansas State	8	–	12	.400	16	–	16	.500
Coastal Carolina	8	–	12	.400	16	–	17	.485
Louisiana–Monroe	5	–	15	.250	9	–	20	.310
Troy	5	–	15	.250	9	–	22	.290
Note: The 2020 Sun Belt Tournament was canceled after the quarterfinals due to the COVID-19 pandemic.

The 2019–20 Arkansas State Red Wolves men's basketball team represented Arkansas State University during the 2019–20 NCAA Division I men's basketball season. The Red Wolves, led by third-year head coach Mike Balado, played their home games at the First National Bank Arena in Jonesboro, Arkansas as members of the Sun Belt Conference. They finished the season 16–16, 8–12 in Sun Belt play to finish in a three-way tie for eighth place. As the No. 9 seed in the Sun Belt tournament, they lost in the first round to Louisiana.

== Previous season ==
The Red Wolves finished the 2018–19 season 13–19, 7–11 in Sun Belt play to finish in 9th place. They lost in the first round of the Sun Belt tournament to South Alabama.

== Roster ==
2019–20 Arkansas State Red Wolves men's basketball team
Players
Coaches

Pos.	#	Name	Height	Weight	Year	Hometown
G	0	Caleb Fields	6 ft 0 in (1.83 m)	185 lb (84 kg)	Fr	Lewisburg, TN
G	1	Jerry Johnson Jr.	6 ft 2 in (1.88 m)	225 lb (102 kg)	Sr	Memphis, TN
G	2	Kobe Wilson	6 ft 2 in (1.88 m)	188 lb (85 kg)	So	Palestine, TX
F	3	Malik Brevard	6 ft 8 in (2.03 m)	215 lb (98 kg)	Sr	Charlotte, NC
F	4	J.J. Matthews	6 ft 9 in (2.06 m)	240 lb (109 kg)	RS Jr	Richmond, VA
G	5	Christian Willis	6 ft 1 in (1.85 m)	190 lb (86 kg)	RS Jr	Belleville, IL
G	10	Malcolm Farrington	6 ft 4 in (1.93 m)	195 lb (88 kg)	Fr	West Palm Beach, FL
G	11	Melo Eggleston	6 ft 8 in (2.03 m)	197 lb (89 kg)	RS So	Suitland, MD
G	12	Canberk Kus	6 ft 6 in (1.98 m)	207 lb (94 kg)	Sr	Istanbul, Turkey
G/F	13	J'Sebian Brown	6 ft 4 in (1.93 m)	160 lb (73 kg)	Jr	Memphis, TN
F	15	Jake Scoggins	6 ft 9 in (2.06 m)	220 lb (100 kg)	RS Jr	Benton, AR
G	21	Avery Felts	6 ft 2 in (1.88 m)	175 lb (79 kg)	Fr	Jonesboro, AR
F	22	Lony Francis Jr.	6 ft 7 in (2.01 m)	225 lb (102 kg)	Jr	Columbus, OH
G	23	Marquis Eaton	6 ft 2 in (1.88 m)	185 lb (84 kg)	Jr	Helena, AR
F	32	Antwon Jackson	6 ft 7 in (2.01 m)	250 lb (113 kg)	Fr	Las Vegas, NV

Head coach

- Mike Balado (St. Thomas)

Assistant coach(es)

- Rick Cabrera (Tennessee Tech)
- Casey Stanley (Iona)
- Mike Scutero (UCF)

Legend

- (C) Team captain
- (S) Suspended
- (I) Ineligible
- (W) Walk-on
- Injured
- Current redshirt

Roster
Last update: September 19, 2019

== Schedule and results ==
Date time, TV	Rank^{#}	Opponent^{#}	Result	Record	Site (attendance) city, state
Exhibition
October 30, 2019*; 7:00 pm		Harding	W 80–54		First National Bank Arena; Jonesboro, AR
Regular season
November 6, 2019*; 7:00 pm		Arkansas–Monticello	W 65–49	1–0	First National Bank Arena (1,397); Jonesboro, AR
November 8, 2019*; 6:00 pm, SECN+		at Ole Miss	L 43–71	1–1	The Pavilion at Ole Miss (8,009); Oxford, MS
November 14, 2019*; 7:30 pm, ESPN+		VMI; Red Wolves Classic	W 71–59	2–1	First National Bank Arena (1,104); Jonesboro, AR
November 15, 2019*; 7:30 pm		UC Davis; Red Wolves Classic	W 80–67	3–1	First National Bank Arena (1,176); Jonesboro, AR
November 17, 2019*; 1:30 pm, ESPN+		Idaho; Red Wolves Classic	W 82–68	4–1	First National Bank Arena (987); Jonesboro, AR
November 20, 2019*; 8:00 pm		at Colorado State	W 80–78	5–1	Moby Arena (2,306); Fort Collins, CO
November 30, 2019*; 4:00 pm		Stephen F. Austin	L 57–76	5–2	First National Bank Arena (1,606); Jonesboro, AR
December 3, 2019*; 7:00 pm, ESPN+		Omaha	W 78–73	6–2	First National Bank Arena (1,126); Jonesboro, AR
December 7, 2019*; 2:00 pm, ESPN3		at Tulsa	W 66–63	7–2	Reynolds Center (3,074); Tulsa, OK
December 11, 2019*; 7:00 pm, ESPN+		at Missouri State	L 53–75	7–3	JQH Arena (3,891); Springfield, MO
December 18, 2019; 7:00 pm, ESPN+		Louisiana	W 79–67	8–3 (1–0)	First National Bank Arena (1,177); Jonesboro, AR
December 21, 2019; 2:00 pm, ESPN+		at Louisiana–Monroe	W 62–59	9–3 (2–0)	Fant–Ewing Coliseum (2,021); Monroe, LA
December 28, 2019*; 4:00 pm		Freed–Hardeman	W 84–73	10–3	First National Bank Arena (1,173); Jonesboro, AR
January 2, 2020; 7:00 pm, ESPN+		UT Arlington	L 52–73	10–4 (2–1)	First National Bank Arena (1,276); Jonesboro, AR
January 4, 2020; 2:00 pm, ESPN+		Texas State	L 67–70	10–5 (2–2)	First National Bank Arena (1,275); Jonesboro, AR
January 6, 2020; 7:00 pm, ESPN+		Georgia State	W 90–87	11–5 (3–2)	First National Bank Arena (1,105); Jonesboro, AR
January 9, 2020; 7:00 pm, ESPN+		at South Alabama	L 59–75	11–6 (3–3)	Mitchell Center (1,392); Mobile, AL
January 11, 2020; 4:00 pm, ESPN+		Troy	W 76–68	12–6 (4–3)	First National Bank Arena (1,377); Jonesboro, AR
January 16, 2020; 6:00 pm, ESPN+		at Appalachian State	L 80–83	12–7 (4–4)	Holmes Center (1,566); Boone, NC
January 18, 2020; 1:00 pm, ESPN+		at Coastal Carolina	W 80–75	13–7 (5–4)	HTC Center (1,313); Conway, SC
January 23, 2020; 7:00 pm, ESPN+		South Alabama	W 75–71	14–7 (6–4)	First National Bank Arena (3,119); Jonesboro, AR
January 25, 2020; 1:00 pm, ESPN+		at Troy	W 78–62	15–7 (7–4)	Trojan Arena (2,538); Troy, AL
January 30, 2020; 7:00 pm, ESPN+		Appalachian State	L 64–71	15–8 (7–5)	First National Bank Arena (1,971); Jonesboro, AR
February 1, 2020; 4:00 pm, ESPN+		Coastal Carolina	L 77–83	15–9 (7–6)	First National Bank Arena (1,697); Jonesboro, AR
February 8, 2020; 2:00 pm, ESPN+		at Little Rock	L 87–90	15–10 (7–7)	Jack Stephens Center (3,522); Little Rock, AR
February 13, 2020; 7:00 pm, ESPN+		at UT Arlington	L 67–77	15–11 (7–8)	College Park Center (1,499); Arlington, TX
February 15, 2020; 2:00 pm, ESPN+		at Texas State	L 64–69	15–12 (7–9)	Strahan Arena (1,706); San Marcos, TX
February 19, 2020; 7:00 pm, ESPN+		Louisiana–Monroe	L 52–66	15–13 (7–10)	First National Bank Arena (1,227); Jonesboro, AR
February 22, 2020; 4:00 pm, ESPN+		Little Rock	L 78–81	15–14 (7–11)	First National Bank Arena (2,815); Jonesboro, AR
February 26, 2020; 7:00 pm, ESPN+		at Louisiana	L 74–77	15–15 (7–12)	Cajundome (3,651); Lafayette, LA
March 3, 2020; 6:00 pm, ESPN+		at Georgia Southern	W 76–75	16–15 (8–12)	Hanner Fieldhouse (1,217); Statesboro, GA
Sun Belt tournament
March 7, 2020; 11:00 am, ESPN+	(9)	at (8) Louisiana; First round	L 66–73	16–16	Cajundome (3,141); Lafayette, LA
*Non-conference game. ^{#}Rankings from AP Poll. (#) Tournament seedings in parentheses. All times are in Central Time. Source.
