= GSU Sports Arena =

Sports arena in Georgia, United States

Georgia State University Sports Arena
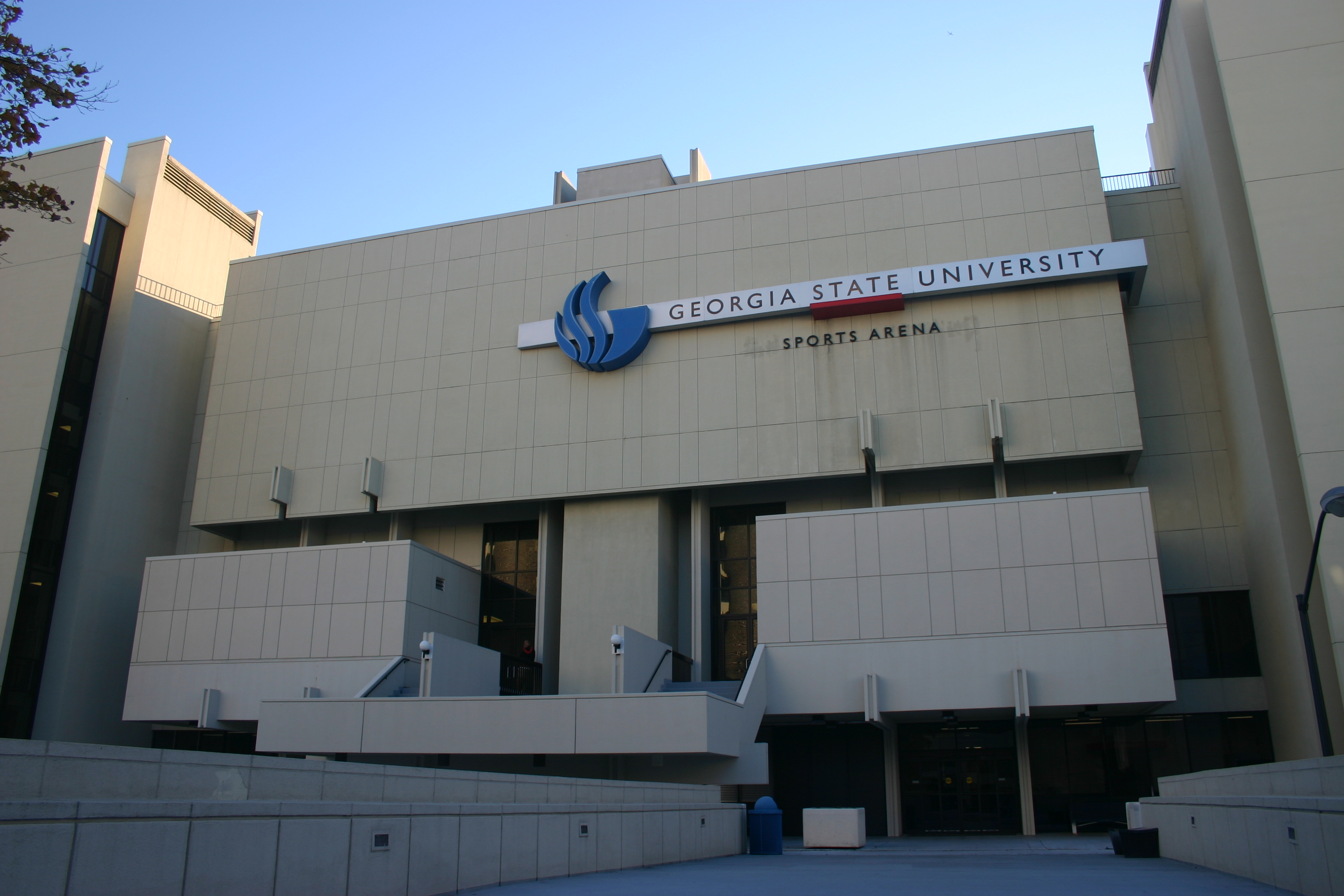
- Interactive map of Georgia State University Sports Arena
- Location: 125 Decatur St SE, Atlanta, Georgia 30303
- Coordinates: 33°45′5″N 84°23′10″W
- Owner: Georgia State University
- Operator: Georgia State University
- Capacity: 3,854

Construction
- Groundbreaking: 1972
- Opened: 1973

Tenants
- Georgia State Panthers (men's and women's basketball (1973–2022), women's volleyball (1973–present)

The Georgia State University Sports Arena is an indoor arena located in Atlanta, Georgia, United States. It was the home of the basketball teams of Georgia State University from 1973 until 2022 and hosted the badminton competition of the 1996 Summer Olympics. It is the home of Georgia State's women's volleyball team.

== Description ==
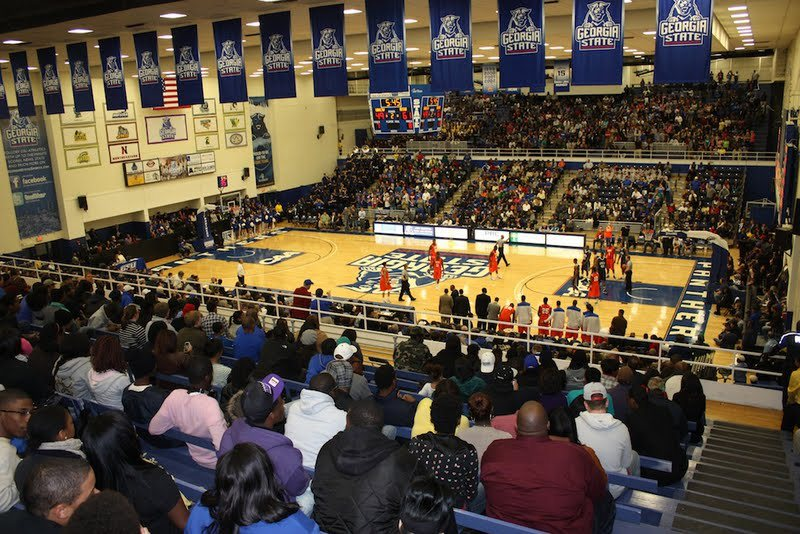
The GSU Sports Arena during a men's basketball game

The Georgia State Sports Arena consists of four stories. The gymnasium floor is on the third level and was the home court for men's and women's basketball and is currently the home of women's volleyball. Arena seating is available on the third and fourth floors. Locker rooms are located on the third floor under the fourth floor seating. The Georgia State University athletics department is located on the first floor of the building. Also in the building is a Student-Athlete Learning Lab.

The main court (named the Charles "Lefty" Driesell Court for the former Panthers men's basketball coach) has a four-sided scoreboard hanging from the ceiling as well as a "Jumbotron" style video signage board on the south end wall.

== History ==
Construction of the arena began in 1972 as class space for physical education classes and as a recreation center for students. Men's basketball began using it as its home court in 1973.

On December 12, 2003, the main court was named the Charles "Lefty" Driesell Court after the former men's basketball coach. A ceremony was held during the halftime of an 88-57 victory over the University of South Alabama.

During the 2002-03 season, a four-sided scoreboard was added hanging from the ceiling as well as a "jumbotron" style screen on the south wall. Renovations in 2004 replaced the playing floor of the main court as well as painting the walls. More recently, a 225 Student-Athlete Learning Lab was opened on the first floor providing athlete advisement, study halls, tutorials, and computer labs.

Prior to the 2013 men's and women's basketball seasons, the locker rooms were moved from the 2nd floor to the 3rd floor, taking up space previously used for large functions. Renovations included the additions of a players lounge and conference hall, as well as stylized graphics lining the hallways and locker rooms.

A new center-hung videoboard was installed during the summer of 2015 following the Panthers' NCAA tournament run, along with a digital scorer's table board.

=== Replacement ===
In February 2018, The Signal reported plans for a 200,000 square foot (18,600 m^{2}) convocation center with seating for up to 8,000 spectators, that would take over as the venue for men's and women's basketball, as well as being used for commencement ceremonies, concerts, and other large events. However, the basketball programs' administrative offices and practice facilities remain in the Sports Arena.

On February 25, 2022, the Panthers played their last game in GSU Sports Arena beating Louisiana 65-58. The Georgia State Convocation Center opened in 2022.

== Events ==
- The GSU Sports Arena was used during the 1996 Summer Olympics in Atlanta to host the badminton competition.
- In 2002 and 2007, the arena hosted ESPN's College Slam Dunk and 3-point Championships during the 2002 and 2007 Final Four competition.
- The pop band *NSYNC hosted their first "Challenge for the Children" celebrity basketball benefit game on August 25, 1999. The event raised funds for Atlanta area charities.
- Various graduations both for Georgia State University students and high school students are held annually at the arena.
- Various performances have been held by different entertainers, including Jay Leno, Dana Carvey, Jamie Foxx, The Spinners, the Beastie Boys, Cheap Trick, Ludacris and the Harlem Globetrotters.
- The arena hosted the 2001 and 2003 Atlantic Sun Conference men's basketball tournaments.

== See also ==
- List of NCAA Division I basketball arenas
