= 2020–21 Appalachian State Mountaineers men's basketball team =

American college basketball season

2020–21 Appalachian State Mountaineers men's basketball

Sun Belt tournament champions

NCAA tournament, First Four
- Conference: Sun Belt Conference
- East Division
- Record: 17–12 (7–8 Sun Belt)
- Head coach: Dustin Kerns (2nd season)
- Assistant coaches: Patrick Moynihan; Bob Szorc; Frank Young
- Home arena: George M. Holmes Convocation Center

2020–21 Sun Belt Conference men's basketball standings
| | Conf. | | | | Overall |
| Team | W | | L | PCT | W | | L | PCT |
|---|---|---|---|---|---|---|---|---|
East
| Georgia State | 8 | – | 4 | .667 | 16 | – | 6 | .727 |
| Coastal Carolina | 9 | – | 5 | .643 | 18 | – | 8 | .692 |
| South Alabama | 10 | – | 7 | .588 | 17 | – | 11 | .607 |
| Appalachian State † | 7 | – | 8 | .467 | 17 | – | 12 | .586 |
| Georgia Southern | 7 | – | 9 | .438 | 13 | – | 13 | .500 |
| Troy | 4 | – | 12 | .250 | 11 | – | 17 | .393 |
West
| Texas State | 12 | – | 3 | .800 | 18 | – | 7 | .720 |
| Louisiana | 10 | – | 7 | .588 | 17 | – | 9 | .654 |
| UT Arlington | 9 | – | 8 | .529 | 13 | – | 13 | .500 |
| Arkansas State | 7 | – | 8 | .467 | 11 | – | 13 | .458 |
| Little Rock | 7 | – | 11 | .389 | 11 | – | 15 | .423 |
| Louisiana–Monroe | 5 | – | 13 | .278 | 7 | – | 19 | .269 |
† 2021 Sun Belt Tournament winner

The 2020–21 Appalachian State Mountaineers men's basketball team represented Appalachian State University in the 2020–21 NCAA Division I men's basketball season. The Mountaineers, led by second-year head coach Dustin Kerns, played their home games at the George M. Holmes Convocation Center in Boone, North Carolina as members of the Sun Belt Conference. With the creation of divisions to cut down on travel due to the COVID-19 pandemic, they played in the East Division. They finished the season 17–12, 7–8 in Sun Belt Play to finish 4th in the East Division. They defeated Little Rock, Texas State, Coastal Carolina, and Georgia State to win the Sun Belt tournament. They received the conference's automatic bid to the NCAA tournament where they lost in the First Four to Norfolk State.

== Previous season ==
The Mountaineers finished the 2019–20 season 18–15, 11–9 in Sun Belt play to finish in sixth place. They defeated Coastal Carolina in the second round of the Sun Belt tournament before losing in the quarterfinals to Texas State.

== Roster ==
2020–21 Appalachian State Mountaineers men's basketball team
Players
Coaches

| Pos. | # | Name | Height | Weight | Year | Hometown |
|---|---|---|---|---|---|---|
| G | 0 | Xavion Brown | 6 ft 3 in (1.91 m) | 180 lb (82 kg) | Fr | Sacramento, California |
| G | 1 | Justin Forrest | 6 ft 2 in (1.88 m) | 195 lb (88 kg) | Sr | Decatur, Georgia |
| F | 2 | Kendall Lewis | 6 ft 7 in (2.01 m) | 180 lb (82 kg) | So | Snellville, Georgia |
| G | 3 | Deshon Parker | 6 ft 4 in (1.93 m) | 195 lb (88 kg) | Jr | Huber Heights, Ohio |
| F | 4 | R. J. Duhart | 6 ft 9 in (2.06 m) | 205 lb (93 kg) | So | Boynton Beach, Florida |
| G | 5 | Michael Almonacy | 6 ft 0 in (1.83 m) | 180 lb (82 kg) | GS | Brentwood, New York |
| G | 10 | Michael Eads | 6 ft 4 in (1.93 m) | 200 lb (91 kg) | Fr | Orlando, Florida |
| G/F | 11 | Donovan Gregory | 6 ft 5 in (1.96 m) | 190 lb (86 kg) | So | Charlotte, North Carolina |
| G | 12 | Andrew Muse | 6 ft 2 in (1.88 m) | 165 lb (75 kg) | So | Winston-Salem, North Carolina |
| G | 14 | Bryant Greene | 6 ft 1 in (1.85 m) | 175 lb (79 kg) | So | Boone, North Carolina |
| F | 15 | C. J. Huntley | 6 ft 10 in (2.08 m) | 190 lb (86 kg) | Fr | Huntersville, North Carolina |
| G | 20 | Adrian Delph | 6 ft 3 in (1.91 m) | 185 lb (84 kg) | Jr | Kings Mountain, North Carolina |
| F | 24 | R. J. Wilson | 6 ft 6 in (1.98 m) | 240 lb (109 kg) | RS Fr | Raleigh, North Carolina |
| F | 25 | James Lewis Jr. | 6 ft 8 in (2.03 m) | 215 lb (98 kg) | RS Jr | Mount Holly, North Carolina |
| G | 30 | Jamie Baker | 5 ft 11 in (1.8 m) | 160 lb (73 kg) | Sr | Concord, North Carolina |
| C | 33 | Sasha Glushkov | 6 ft 9 in (2.06 m) | 235 lb (107 kg) | Fr | Vladivostok, Russia |

Head coach

- Dustin Kerns (Clemson)

Assistant coach(es)

- Patrick Moynihan (North Georgia)
- Bob Szorc (St. John's)
- Frank Young (West Virginia)

Legend

- (C) Team captain
- (S) Suspended
- (I) Ineligible
- (W) Walk-on
- Injured
- Current redshirt

Roster
Last update: November 25, 2020

== Schedule and results ==
| Date time, TV | Rank^{#} | Opponent^{#} | Result | Record | High points | High rebounds | High assists | Site (attendance) city, state |
Non-conference Regular season
| November 25, 2020*; 7:00 pm | | at South Carolina State | W 81–61 | 1–0 | 14 – Gregory | 7 – Forrest | 3 – Forrest | SHM Memorial Center; Orangeburg, SC |
| November 27, 2020*; 6:00 pm, ESPN+ | | Carver | W 105–23 | 2–0 | 12 – Lewis Jr. | 13 – Glushkov | 4 – Forrest | Holmes Center (25); Boone, NC |
| November 30, 2020*; 6:00 pm, ESPN+ | | Bowling Green | L 76–78 ^{OT} | 2–1 | 21 – Almonacy | 8 – Lewis Jr. | 5 – Gregory | Holmes Center (25); Boone, NC |
| December 1, 2020*; 6:00 pm, ESPN+ | | St. Andrews | Game cancelled due to COVID-19 pandemic restrictions | | | | | Holmes Center; Boone, NC |
| December 3, 2020*; 6:00 pm, ESPN+ | | Carolina | Game cancelled due to COVID-19 pandemic restrictions | | | | | Holmes Center; Boone, NC |
| December 6, 2020*; 4:00 pm, ESPN+ | | North Carolina Wesleyan | W 81–57 | 3–1 | 18 – Huntley | 8 – Almonacy | 5 – Forrest | Holmes Center (85); Boone, NC |
| December 7, 2020*; 4:00 pm, ESPN+ | | LaGrange | Game cancelled due to COVID-19 pandemic restrictions | | | | | Holmes Center; Boone, NC |
| December 11, 2020*; 5:00 pm, ESPNU | | at Charlotte | W 61–57 | 4–1 | 21 – Delph | 7 – Lewis | 5 – Delph | Halton Arena (73); Charlotte, NC |
| December 15, 2020*; 7:00 pm, SECN | | at No. 10 Tennessee | L 38–79 | 4–2 | 9 – Almonacy | 6 – Almonacy | 3 – Almonacy | Thompson–Boling Arena (4,191); Knoxville, TN |
| December 17, 2020*; 6:00 pm, ESPN+ | | Greensboro | W 87–47 | 5–2 | 18 – Gregory | 7 – TEAM | 5 – Gregory | Holmes Center (85); Boone, NC |
| December 18, 2020*; 4:00 pm, ESPN+ | | Columbia International | W 77–41 | 6–2 | 14 – Delph | 9 – Gregory | 3 – Brown | Holmes Center (85); Boone, NC |
| December 22, 2020*; 3:00 pm, SECN | | at Auburn | L 53–67 | 6–3 | 15 – Almonacy | 4 – Parker | 2 – Parker | Auburn Arena (1,824); Auburn, AL |
Conference Regular season
| January 1, 2021; 6:00 pm, ESPN+ | | Troy | L 56–69 | 6–4 (0–1) | 16 – Lewis Jr. | 8 – Gregory | 3 – Forrest | Holmes Center (85); Boone, NC |
| January 2, 2021; 4:00 pm, ESPN+ | | Troy | W 90–59 | 7–4 (1–1) | 21 – Forrest | 5 – Almonacy | 10 – Almonacy | Holmes Center (85); Boone, NC |
| January 8, 2021; 6:00 pm, ESPN+ | | Georgia Southern | W 66–63 | 8–4 (2–1) | 14 – Almonacy | 6 – Gregory | 3 – Forrest | Holmes Center (85); Boone, NC |
| January 9, 2021; 4:00 pm, ESPN+ | | Georgia Southern | W 77–71 | 9–4 (3–1) | 19 – Gregory | 11 – Lewis Jr. | 6 – Forrest | Holmes Center (85); Boone, NC |
| January 15, 2021; 7:00 pm, ESPN+ | | at South Alabama | L 64–73 | 9–5 (3–2) | 14 – Gregory | 8 – Delph | 4 – Parker | Mitchell Center (871); Mobile, AL |
| January 16, 2021; 5:00 pm, ESPN+ | | at South Alabama | W 83–77 | 10–5 (4–2) | 28 – Delph | 6 – Lewis Jr. | 6 – Forrest | Mitchell Center (867); Mobile, AL |
| January 22, 2021; 6:00 pm, ESPN+ | | Georgia State | W 80–71 | 11–5 (5–2) | 23 – Forrest | 5 – Lewis Jr. | 4 – Gregory | Holmes Center (85); Boone, NC |
| January 23, 2021; 4:00 pm, ESPN+ | | Georgia State | W 74–61 | 12–5 (6–2) | 22 – Lewis Jr. | 14 – Lewis Jr. | 2 – Forrest | Holmes Center (85); Boone, NC |
| January 29, 2021; 7:00 pm, ESPN+ | | at Troy | L 62–71 | 12–6 (6–3) | 15 – Gregory | 9 – Lewis Jr. | 2 – Forrest | Trojan Arena (1,189); Troy, AL |
| January 30, 2021; 2:00 pm, ESPN+ | | at Troy | L 59–65 | 12–7 (6–4) | 15 – Forrest | 7 – Almonacy | 4 – Forrest | Trojan Arena (1,021); Troy, AL |
| February 5, 2021; 6:00 pm, ESPN+ | | at Georgia State | Postponed due to COVID-19 | | | | | GSU Sports Arena; Atlanta, GA |
| February 6, 2021; 4:00 pm, ESPN+ | | at Georgia State | Postponed due to COVID-19 | | | | | GSU Sports Arena; Atlanta, GA |
| February 11, 2021; 6:00 pm, ESPN+ | | Coastal Carolina | Canceled due to COVID-19 | | | | | Holmes Center; Boone, NC |
| February 13, 2021; 3:00 pm, ESPN+ | | at Coastal Carolina | Canceled due to COVID-19 | | | | | HTC Center; Conway, SC |
| February 19, 2021; 6:00 pm, ESPN+ | | South Alabama | L 63–65 | 12–8 (6–5) | 20 – Forrest | 13 – Gregory | 2 – Almonacy | Holmes Center (85); Boone, NC |
| February 20, 2021; 4:00 pm, ESPN+ | | South Alabama | L 54–56 | 12–9 (6–6) | 20 – Forrest | 10 – Lewis Jr. | 3 – Gregory | Holmes Center (85); Boone, NC |
| February 23, 2021; 5:00 pm, ESPN+ | | at Georgia State | L 71–85 | 12–10 (6–7) | 24 – Almonacy | 7 – Lewis Jr. | 4 – Forrest | GSU Sports Arena (1,328); Atlanta, GA |
| February 26, 2021; 6:00 pm, ESPN+ | | at Georgia Southern | W 84–78 ^{2OT} | 13–10 (7–7) | 24 – Forrest | 8 – Delph | 6 – Almonacy | Hanner Fieldhouse; Statesboro, GA |
| February 27, 2021; ESPN+ | | at Georgia Southern | L 57–65 | 13–11 (7–8) | 19 – Delph | 8 – Gregory | 2 – Almonacy | Hanner Fieldhouse; Statesboro, GA |
Sun Belt tournament
| March 5, 2021; 8:30 pm, ESPN+ | (E4) | vs. (W5) Little Rock; First round | W 67–60 | 14–11 | 24 – Forrest | 7 – Almonacy | 7 – Almonacy | Hartsell Arena (148); Pensacola, FL |
| March 6, 2021; 8:00 pm, ESPN+ | (E4) | vs. (W1) Texas State; Quarterfinals | W 76–73 ^{OT} | 15–11 | 28 – Forrest | 9 – Gregory | 5 – Gregory | Pensacola Bay Center; Pensacola, FL |
| March 7, 2021; 9:00 pm, ESPN+ | (E4) | vs. (E2) Coastal Carolina; Semifinals | W 64–61 ^{OT} | 16–11 | 19 – Tied | 14 – Gregory | 6 – Gregory | Pensacola Bay Center; Pensacola, FL |
| March 8, 2021; 5:00 pm, ESPN2 | (E4) | vs. (E1) Georgia State; Championship | W 80–73 | 17–11 | 32 – Almonacy | 10 – Gregory | 2 – Tied | Pensacola Bay Center; Pensacola, FL |
NCAA tournament
| March 18, 2021; 8:40 pm, truTV | (16 W) | vs. (16 W) Norfolk State; First Four | L 53–54 | 17–12 | 18 – Forrest | 11 – Duhart | 4 – Gregory | Simon Skjodt Assembly Hall; Bloomington, IN |
*Non-conference game. ^{#}Rankings from AP Poll. (#) Tournament seedings in parentheses. W=West. All times are in Eastern.
