= 2020–21 Troy Trojans men's basketball team =

American college basketball season

2020–21 Troy Trojans men's basketball
- Conference: Sun Belt Conference
- East Division
- Record: 11–17 (4–12 Sun Belt)
- Head coach: Scott Cross (2nd season)
- Assistant coaches: Kenneth Mangrum; Byron Jones; Mike Worley
- Home arena: Trojan Arena (Capacity 6,000)

2020–21 Sun Belt Conference men's basketball standings
| | Conf. | | | | Overall |
| Team | W | | L | PCT | W | | L | PCT |
|---|---|---|---|---|---|---|---|---|
East
| Georgia State | 8 | – | 4 | .667 | 16 | – | 6 | .727 |
| Coastal Carolina | 9 | – | 5 | .643 | 18 | – | 8 | .692 |
| South Alabama | 10 | – | 7 | .588 | 17 | – | 11 | .607 |
| Appalachian State † | 7 | – | 8 | .467 | 17 | – | 12 | .586 |
| Georgia Southern | 7 | – | 9 | .438 | 13 | – | 13 | .500 |
| Troy | 4 | – | 12 | .250 | 11 | – | 17 | .393 |
West
| Texas State | 12 | – | 3 | .800 | 18 | – | 7 | .720 |
| Louisiana | 10 | – | 7 | .588 | 17 | – | 9 | .654 |
| UT Arlington | 9 | – | 8 | .529 | 13 | – | 13 | .500 |
| Arkansas State | 7 | – | 8 | .467 | 11 | – | 13 | .458 |
| Little Rock | 7 | – | 11 | .389 | 11 | – | 15 | .423 |
| Louisiana–Monroe | 5 | – | 13 | .278 | 7 | – | 19 | .269 |
† 2021 Sun Belt Tournament winner

The 2020–21 Troy Trojans men's basketball team represented Troy University in the 2020–21 NCAA Division I men's basketball season. The Trojans, led by second-year head coach Scott Cross, played their home games at Trojan Arena in Troy, Alabama as members of the Sun Belt Conference. With the creation of divisions to cut down on travel due to the COVID-19 pandemic, they played in the East Division.

== Previous season ==
The Trojans finished the 2019–20 season 9–22, 5–15 in Sun Belt play to finish in a tie for 11th place. They failed to qualify for the Sun Belt tournament.

== Roster ==
2020–21 Troy Trojans men's basketball team
Players
Coaches

| Pos. | # | Name | Height | Weight | Year | Hometown |
|---|---|---|---|---|---|---|
| G | 0 | Keiffer Punter | 6 ft 5 in (1.96 m) | 175 lb (79 kg) | Jr | Bronx, New York |
| G | 1 | Marquel Bryant | 6 ft 2 in (1.88 m) | 195 lb (88 kg) | Fr | Sarasota, Florida |
| F | 2 | Antwan Burnett | 6 ft 5 in (1.96 m) | 210 lb (95 kg) | Fr | Montgomery, Alabama |
| G | 3 | Kam Woods | 6 ft 1 in (1.85 m) | 170 lb (77 kg) | Fr | Bessemer, Alabama |
| G | 4 | Quinnus Fletcher | 5 ft 10 in (1.78 m) | 130 lb (59 kg) | Fr | Opelika, Alabama |
| F | 5 | Rory Pantophlet | 6 ft 10 in (2.08 m) | 230 lb (104 kg) | Jr | Philipsburg, Sint Maarten |
| F | 10 | Zay Williams | 6 ft 9 in (2.06 m) | 190 lb (86 kg) | Jr | Birmingham, Alabama |
| G | 11 | Desmond Williams | 6 ft 1 in (1.85 m) | 165 lb (75 kg) | So | Montgomery, Alabama |
| F | 13 | Khalyl Waters | 6 ft 5 in (1.96 m) | 190 lb (86 kg) | Sr | Douglasville, Georgia |
| G | 14 | Jakevan Leftridge | 6 ft 7 in (2.01 m) | 180 lb (82 kg) | So | Dallas, Texas |
| G | 15 | Duke Miles | 6 ft 2 in (1.88 m) | 175 lb (79 kg) | Fr | Montgomery, Alabama |
| F | 21 | Miles Mendes | 6 ft 5 in (1.96 m) | 225 lb (102 kg) | Fr | Minneapolis, Minnesota |
| G | 22 | Nick O'Brien | 6 ft 0 in (1.83 m) | 180 lb (82 kg) | Fr | Troy, Alabama |
| F | 24 | Nick Stampley | 6 ft 6 in (1.98 m) | 210 lb (95 kg) | Sr | Broward County, Florida |
| F | 30 | Christian Turner | 6 ft 7 in (2.01 m) | 220 lb (100 kg) | Fr | Grand Prairie, Texas |
| F | 32 | Lydell Greffrard | 6 ft 8 in (2.03 m) | 245 lb (111 kg) | RS Jr | New York City, New York |

Head coach

- Scott Cross (UT Arlington)

Assistant coach(es)

- Kenneth Mangrum (North Texas)
- Byron Jones (Eastern Kentucky)
- Mike Worley (Denver)

Legend

- (C) Team captain
- (S) Suspended
- (I) Ineligible
- (W) Walk-on
- Injured
- Current redshirt

Roster
Last update: November 27, 2020

== Schedule and results ==
| Date time, TV | Rank^{#} | Opponent^{#} | Result | Record | High points | High rebounds | High assists | Site (attendance) city, state |
Non-conference Regular season
| November 25, 2020* | | Middle Georgia | Cancelled due to COVID-19 protocol | | | | | Trojan Arena; Troy, AL |
| November 27, 2020*; 12:00 pm, ESPN+ | | vs. Western Carolina; Mako Medical Asheville Classic | W 66–64 | 1–0 | 20 – Woods | 9 – Z. Williams | 3 – Woods | Kimmel Arena; Asheville, NC |
| November 28, 2020*; 12:00 pm, ESPN+ | | vs. UNC Wilmington; Mako Medical Asheville Classic | L 50–73 | 1–1 | 15 – D. Williams | 9 – Z. Williams | 2 – Woods | Kimmell Arena; Asheville, NC |
| December 2, 2020* | | at Wake Forest | Canceled due to COVID-19 issues | | | | | LJVM Coliseum; Winston-Salem, NC |
| December 4, 2020*; 8:00 pm, ESPN2 | | at No. 17 Texas Tech | L 46–80 | 1–2 | 13 – Woods | 8 – Stampley | 3 – Punter | United Supermarkets Arena (4,032); Lubbock, TX |
| December 6, 2020*; 2:00 pm | | at UAB | L 55–77 | 1–3 | 17 – Z. Williams | 8 – TEAM | 3 – Miles | Bartow Arena (969); Birmingham, AL |
| December 10, 2020*; 6:00 pm, ESPN+ | | at North Alabama | W 62–57 | 2–3 | 20 – Waters | 13 – Z. Williams | 2 – Punter | Flowers Hall (312); Florence, AL |
| December 13, 2020*; 2:00 pm, ESPN+ | | Central Baptist | W 61–44 | 3–3 | 13 – Z. Williams | 10 – Mendes | 2 – Z. Williams | Trojan Arena (801); Troy, AL |
| December 16, 2020*; 6:00 pm, ESPN+ | | Samford | W 79–71 | 4–3 | 21 – Waters | 13 – Z. Williams | 4 – Z. Williams | Trojan Arena (897); Troy, AL |
| December 19, 2020*; 1:00 pm, SECN | | at Auburn | L 41–77 | 4–4 | 13 – Stampley | 6 – Z. Williams | 5 – Miles | Auburn Arena (1,824); Auburn, AL |
| December 28, 2020*; 6:00 pm, ESPN+ | | Carver | W 88–35 | 5–4 | 16 – Stampley | 17 – Stampley | 3 – Z. Williams | Trojan Arena (820); Troy, AL |
Conference Regular season
| January 1, 2021; 5:00 pm, ESPN+ | | at Appalachian State | W 69–56 | 6–4 (1–0) | 17 – Waters | 8 – Z. Williams | 4 – Z. Williams | Holmes Center (85); Boone, NC |
| January 2, 2021; 3:00 pm, ESPN+ | | Appalachian State | L 59–90 | 6–5 (1–1) | 19 – Stampley | 6 – Stampley | 3 – Z. Williams | Holmes Center (85); Boone, NC |
| January 8, 2021; 6:00 pm, ESPN+ | | Georgia State | Canceled due to COVID-19 concerns. | | | | | Trojan Arena; Troy, AL |
| January 9, 2021; 6:00 pm, ESPN+ | | Georgia State | Canceled due to COVID-19 concerns. | | | | | Trojan Arena; Troy, AL |
| January 15, 2021; 5:00 pm, ESPN+ | | at Georgia Southern | L 64–67 ^{OT} | 6–6 (1–2) | 23 – Woods | 11 – TEAM | 3 – Waters | Hanner Fieldhouse (783); Statesboro, GA |
| January 16, 2021; 2:00 pm, ESPN+ | | at Georgia Southern | L 56–63 | 6–7 (1–3) | 24 – Z. Williams | 8 – Z. Williams | 3 – Punter | Hanner Fieldhouse (505); Statesboro, GA |
| January 22, 2021; 5:00 pm, ESPN+ | | at Coastal Carolina | L 81–90 | 6–8 (1–4) | 21 – Woods | 12 – Z. Williams | 5 – Woods | HTC Center (153); Conway, SC |
| January 23, 2021; 2:00 pm, ESPN+ | | at Coastal Carolina | L 65–70 | 6–9 (1–5) | 28 – Woods | 13 – Z. Williams | 2 – Woods | HTC Center (149); Conway, SC |
| January 29, 2021; 6:00 pm, ESPN+ | | Appalachian State | W 71–62 | 7–9 (2–5) | 23 – Stampley | 12 – Stampley | 2 – Miles | Trojan Arena (1,189); Troy, AL |
| January 30, 2021; 4:00 pm, ESPN+ | | Appalachian State | W 65–59 | 8–9 (3–5) | 19 – Stampley | 8 – Miles | 6 – Woods | Trojan Arena (1,021); Troy, AL |
| February 2, 2021*; 6:00 pm, ESPN+ | | Spring Hill | W 90–73 | 9–9 | 17 – Z. Williams | 15 – Z. Williams | 4 – Miles | Trojan Arena (979); Troy, AL |
| February 5, 2021; 6:00 pm, ESPN+ | | Georgia Southern | W 68–56 | 10–9 (4–5) | 20 – Miles | 11 – Stampley | 8 – Miles | Trojan Arena (1,003); Troy, AL |
| February 6, 2021; 4:00 pm, ESPN+ | | Georgia Southern | L 64–79 | 10–10 (4–6) | 21 – Miles | 15 – Z. Williams | 3 – Leftridge | Trojan Arena (985); Troy, AL |
| February 11, 2021; 6:00 pm, ESPN+ | | at South Alabama | L 70–73 | 10–11 (4–7) | 20 – Stampley | 7 – Stampley | 6 – Miles | Mitchell Center (1,302); Mobile, AL |
| February 13, 2021; 4:00 pm, ESPN+ | | South Alabama | L 51–58 | 10–12 (4–8) | 14 – Z. Williams | 18 – Z. Williams | 7 – Miles | Trojan Arena (1,047); Troy, AL |
| February 16, 2021; 6:00 pm, ESPN+ | | Georgia State | Canceled due to weather concerns. | | | | | Trojan Arena; Troy, AL |
| February 19, 2021; 5:00 pm, ESPN+ | | at Georgia State | L 66–80 | 10–13 (4–9) | 18 – Stampley | 4 – Waters | 6 – Miles | GSU Sports Arena (1,077); Atlanta, GA |
| February 20, 2021; 3:00 pm, ESPN+ | | at Georgia State | L 53–65 | 10–14 (4–10) | 15 – Woods | 8 – Stampley | 4 – Leftridge | GSU Sports Arena (1,113); Atlanta, GA |
| February 26, 2021; 6:00 pm, ESPN+ | | Coastal Carolina | L 59–75 | 10–15 (4–11) | 14 – Stampley | 7 – Woods | 3 – D. Williams | Trojan Arena; Troy, AL |
| February 27, 2021; 4:00 pm, ESPN+ | | Coastal Carolina | L 71–76 | 10–16 (4–12) | 24 – Stampley | 9 – Stampley | 8 – Miles | Trojan Arena; Troy, AL |
Sun Belt tournament
| March 5, 2021; 8:00 pm, ESPN+ | (E6) | vs. (W3) UT Arlington; First round | W 91–86 | 11–16 | 21 – Azore | 8 – Mwamba | 3 – Wells | Pensacola Bay Center; Pensacola, FL |
| March 6, 2021; 8:30 pm, ESPN+ | (E6) | vs. (E2) Coastal Carolina; Quarterfinals | L 68–86 | 11–17 | 19 – Z. Williams | 12 – Z. Williams | 5 – Miles | Hartsell Arena; Pensacola, FL |
*Non-conference game. ^{#}Rankings from AP Poll. (#) Tournament seedings in parentheses. All times are in Central.
