= 2020–21 Georgia State Panthers men's basketball team =

American college basketball season

2020–21 Georgia State Panthers men's basketball

Sun Belt East Division champions
- Conference: Sun Belt Conference
- East Division
- Record: 16–6 (8–4 Sun Belt)
- Head coach: Rob Lanier (2nd season)
- Assistant coaches: Jarvis Hayes (2nd season); Chris Kreider (2nd season); Cliff Warren (2nd season)
- Home arena: GSU Sports Arena

2020–21 Sun Belt Conference men's basketball standings
	Conf.				Overall
Team	W		L	PCT	W		L	PCT
East
Georgia State	8	–	4	.667	16	–	6	.727
Coastal Carolina	9	–	5	.643	18	–	8	.692
South Alabama	10	–	7	.588	17	–	11	.607
Appalachian State †	7	–	8	.467	17	–	12	.586
Georgia Southern	7	–	9	.438	13	–	13	.500
Troy	4	–	12	.250	11	–	17	.393
West
Texas State	12	–	3	.800	18	–	7	.720
Louisiana	10	–	7	.588	17	–	9	.654
UT Arlington	9	–	8	.529	13	–	13	.500
Arkansas State	7	–	8	.467	11	–	13	.458
Little Rock	7	–	11	.389	11	–	15	.423
Louisiana–Monroe	5	–	13	.278	7	–	19	.269
† 2021 Sun Belt Tournament winner

The 2020–21 Georgia State Panthers men's basketball team represented Georgia State University during the 2020–21 NCAA Division I men's basketball season. The Panthers, led by second-year head coach Rob Lanier, played their home games at the GSU Sports Arena in Atlanta, Georgia as members of the Sun Belt Conference. With the creation of divisions to cut down on travel due to the COVID-19 pandemic, they played in the East Division.

== Previous season ==
The Panthers finished the season 19–13, 12–8 in Sun Belt play to finish in a tie for fourth place. They were the No. 4 seed in the Sun Belt tournament, where they lost to Georgia Southern.

== Roster ==
2020–21 Georgia State Panthers men's basketball team
Players
Coaches

Pos.	#	Name	Height	Weight	Year	Previous school	Hometown
G	0	Evan Johnson	6 ft 0 in (1.83 m)	165 lb (75 kg)	Fr	Oak Hill Academy	Durham, North Carolina
F	1	Eliel Nsoseme	6 ft 9 in (2.06 m)	235 lb (107 kg)	RS Jr	The Rise Centre Academy; Cincinnati	Kinshasa, DR Congo
G	2	Justin Roberts	6 ft 0 in (1.83 m)	170 lb (77 kg)	Jr	Findlay Prep; DePaul	Indianapolis, Indiana
G	4	JoJo Toppin	6 ft 6 in (1.98 m)	190 lb (86 kg)	RS So	Norcross HS; Georgia	Brooklyn, New York
G	10	Nelson Phillips	6 ft 3 in (1.91 m)	180 lb (82 kg)	Jr	Warner Robins HS	Warner Robins, Georgia
G	11	Corey Allen	6 ft 2 in (1.88 m)	210 lb (95 kg)	RS Sr	Ypsilanti HS; Detroit	Ypsilanti, Michigan
G	12	Kane Williams	6 ft 4 in (1.93 m)	195 lb (88 kg)	Sr	South Paulding HS	Douglasville, Georgia
G	21	Kalik Brooks (W)	6 ft 5 in (1.96 m)	190 lb (86 kg)	So	Alpharetta HS	Alpharetta, Georgia
C	23	Joe Jones III	6 ft 9 in (2.06 m)	225 lb (102 kg)	So	The Park School	Buffalo, New York
G	24	Collin Moore	6 ft 5 in (1.96 m)	205 lb (93 kg)	Fr	Sunrise Christian Academy	North Little Rock, Arkansas
F	25	Jalen Thomas	6 ft 10 in (2.08 m)	235 lb (107 kg)	So	University of Detroit Jesuit HS	Detroit, Michigan
F	30	Kaleb Scott	6 ft 7 in (2.01 m)	235 lb (107 kg)	Fr	Holly Springs HS	Fuquay-Varina, North Carolina
G	32	Ryan Boyce	6 ft 6 in (1.98 m)	195 lb (88 kg)	RS So	East High HS; Memphis	Memphis, TN
F	35	Ahmid Bryant	6 ft 6 in (1.98 m)	215 lb (98 kg)	Sr	Langston Hughes HS; East Georgia State	Fairburn, Georgia
G	55	Zach Pina	5 ft 11 in (1.8 m)	175 lb (79 kg)	So	McIntosh HS; East Georgia State	Peachtree City, Georgia

Head coach

- Rob Lanier (St. Bonaventure)

Assistant coach(es)

- Jarvis Hayes (Georgia)
- Chris Kreider (Lebanon Valley)
- Cliff Warren (Mount St. Mary's)

Legend

- (C) Team captain
- (S) Suspended
- (I) Ineligible
- (W) Walk-on
- Injured
- Current redshirt

== Schedule and results ==
Date time, TV	Rank^{#}	Opponent^{#}	Result	Record	High points	High rebounds	High assists	Site (attendance) city, state
Non-conference regular season
November 25, 2020*; 9:00 p.m., FS South		at Georgia Tech	W 123–120 ^{4OT}	1–0	26 – Roberts	12 – Williams	6 – Roberts	McCamish Pavilion (1,200); Atlanta, GA
November 27, 2020*; 4:00 p.m., ESPN+		Toccoa Falls	W 105–60	2–0	23 – Roberts	9 – Nsoseme	6 – Roberts	GSU Sports Arena (615); Atlanta, GA
November 30, 2020*; 7:00 p.m., ESPN+		at Mercer	L 69–86	2–1	18 – Williams	7 – Nsoseme	4 – Roberts	Hawkins Arena (672); Macon, GA
December 4, 2020*; 6:00 p.m.		at Charlotte	W 76–65	3–1	21 – Williams	12 – Nsoseme	4 – Tied	Halton Arena (74); Charlotte, NC
December 16, 2020*; 6:00 p.m., ESPN+		Mercer	W 88–81	4–1	17 – Roberts	20 – Nsoseme	9 – Williams	GSU Sports Arena (907); Atlanta, GA
December 18, 2020*; 2:00 p.m., ESPN+		Carver	W 122–57	5–1	20 – Johnson	9 – Nsoseme	10 – Roberts	GSU Sports Arena (808); Atlanta, GA
December 21, 2020*; 7:00 p.m., ESPN+		College of Charleston	W 72–55	6–1	20 – Tied	10 – Nsoseme	7 – Williams	GSU Sports Arena (630); Atlanta, GA
Conference regular season
January 1, 2021; 6:00 p.m., ESPN+		Coastal Carolina	L 69–81	6–2 (0–1)	14 – Roberts	6 – Thomas	5 – Johnson	HTC Center (145); Conway, SC
January 2, 2021; 3:00 p.m., ESPN+		at Coastal Carolina	W 70–62	7–2 (1–1)	22 – Allen	9 – Thomas	4 – Moore	HTC Center (117); Conway, SC
January 8, 2021; 7:00 p.m., ESPN+		at Troy	Postponed due to COVID-19 issues.					Trojan Arena; Troy, AL
January 9, 2021; 7:00 p.m., ESPN+		at Troy	Postponed due to COVID-19 issues.					Trojan Arena; Troy, AL
January 15, 2021; 6:00 p.m., ESPN+		Coastal Carolina	Postponed due to COVID-19 issues					GSU Sports Arena; Atlanta, GA
January 16, 2021; 4:00 p.m., ESPN+		Coastal Carolina	W 71–68	8–2 (2–1)	15 – Allen	10 – Nsoseme	6 – Roberts	GSU Sports Arena (1,029); Atlanta, GA
January 22, 2021; 6:00 p.m., ESPN+		at Appalachian State	L 71–80	8–3 (2–2)	15 – Nsoseme	8 – Nsoseme	3 – 3 tied	Holmes Center (85); Boone, NC
January 23, 2021; 4:00 p.m., ESPN+		Appalachian State	L 61–74	8–4 (2–3)	19 – Allen	12 – Nsoseme	4 – Williams	Holmes Center (85); Boone, NC
January 29, 2021; 7:00 p.m., ESPN+		South Alabama	Postponed due to COVID-19 issues					GSU Sports Arena; Atlanta, GA
January 30, 2021; 4:00 p.m., ESPN+		South Alabama	Postponed due to COVID-19 issues					GSU Sports Arena; Atlanta, GA
February 5, 2021; 6:00 p.m., ESPN+		Appalachian State	Postponed due to COVID-19 issues					GSU Sports Arena; Atlanta, GA
February 6, 2021; 4:00 p.m., ESPN+		Appalachian State	Postponed due to COVID-19 issues					GSU Sports Arena; Atlanta, GA
February 9, 2021; 2:00 p.m., ESPN+		South Alabama	L 67-70	8–5 (2–4)	18 – Nsoseme	9 – Nsoseme	5 – Williams	GSU Sports Arena (1,135); Atlanta, GA
February 11, 2021; 6:00 p.m., ESPN+		Georgia Southern; Modern Day Hate	W 79–75	9–5 (3–4)	21 – Roberts	12 – Nsoseme	5 – Williams	GSU Sports Arena (1,071); Atlanta, GA
February 13, 2021; 3:00 p.m., ESPN+		at Georgia Southern; Modern Day Hate	Postponed due to weather concerns.					Hanner Fieldhouse; Statesboro, GA
February 16, 2021; 7:00 p.m., ESPN+		at Troy rescheduled from January 9	Postponed due to weather concerns.					Trojan Arena; Troy, AL
February 19, 2021; 6:00 p.m., ESPN+		Troy	W 80–66	10–5 (4–4)	15 – Allen	9 – Nsoseme	9 – Roberts	GSU Sports Arena (1,077); Atlanta, GA
February 20, 2021; 4:00 p.m., ESPN+		Troy	W 65–53	11–5 (5–4)	16 – Allen	6 – Nsoseme	9 – Roberts	GSU Sports Arena (1,113); Atlanta, GA
February 23, 2021; 5:00 p.m., ESPN+		Appalachian State	W 85–71	12–5 (6–4)	24 – Williams	8 – Thomas	6 – Allen	GSU Sports Arena (1,238); Atlanta, GA
February 26, 2021; 9:00 p.m., ESPN2		at South Alabama	W 84–81	13–5 (7–4)	28 – Johnson	11 – Nsoseme	7 – Williams	Mitchell Center; Mobile, AL
February 27, 2021; 7:00 p.m., ESPN+		at South Alabama	W 82–73	14–5 (8–4)	16 – Thomas/Roberts	12 – Thomas	5 – Roberts	Mitchell Center; Mobile, AL
Sun Belt tournament
March 6, 2021; 6:30 pm, ESPN+	(E1)	vs. (W4) Arkansas State; Quarterfinals	W 71–68	15–5	17 – Roberts	12 – Nsoseme	5 – Williams	Pensacola Bay Center; Pensacola, FL
March 7, 2021; 6:30 pm, ESPN+	(E1)	vs. (W2) Louisiana; Semifinals	W 84–73	16–5	21 – Allen	12 – Nsoseme	5 – Williams	Pensacola Bay Center; Pensacola, FL
March 8, 2021; 7:00 pm, ESPN2	(E1)	vs. (E4) Appalachian State; Championship	L 73–80	16–6	18 – Williams	10 – Nsoseme	3 – Roberts	Pensacola Bay Center; Pensacola, FL
*Non-conference game. ^{#}Rankings from AP Poll. (#) Tournament seedings in parentheses. All times are in Eastern Time.
