= 2020–21 Georgia Southern Eagles men's basketball team =

American college basketball season

2020–21 Georgia Southern Eagles men's basketball
- Conference: Sun Belt Conference
- East Division
- Record: 13–13 (7–9 Sun Belt)
- Head coach: Brian Burg (1st season)
- Associate head coach: Chris Shumate
- Assistant coaches: Shawn Forrest; Tim MacAllister
- Home arena: Hanner Fieldhouse

2020–21 Sun Belt Conference men's basketball standings
	Conf.				Overall
Team	W		L	PCT	W		L	PCT
East
Georgia State	8	–	4	.667	16	–	6	.727
Coastal Carolina	9	–	5	.643	18	–	8	.692
South Alabama	10	–	7	.588	17	–	11	.607
Appalachian State †	7	–	8	.467	17	–	12	.586
Georgia Southern	7	–	9	.438	13	–	13	.500
Troy	4	–	12	.250	11	–	17	.393
West
Texas State	12	–	3	.800	18	–	7	.720
Louisiana	10	–	7	.588	17	–	9	.654
UT Arlington	9	–	8	.529	13	–	13	.500
Arkansas State	7	–	8	.467	11	–	13	.458
Little Rock	7	–	11	.389	11	–	15	.423
Louisiana–Monroe	5	–	13	.278	7	–	19	.269
† 2021 Sun Belt Tournament winner

The 2020–21 Georgia Southern Eagles men's basketball team represented Georgia Southern University in the 2020–21 NCAA Division I men's basketball season. The Eagles, led by first-year head coach Brian Burg, played their home games at Hanner Fieldhouse in Statesboro, Georgia as members of the Sun Belt Conference. With the creation of divisions to cut down on travel due to the COVID-19 pandemic, they played in the East Division.

== Previous season ==
The Eagles finished the 2019–20 season 20–13, 12–8 in Sun Belt play to finish in a tie for fourth place. They were the No. 5 seed in the Sun Belt tournament, where they defeated Louisiana and Georgia State. However, the tournament was later cancelled amid the COVID-19 pandemic.

On March 20, 2020, head coach Mark Byington resigned to become the head coach at James Madison. He finished at Georgia Southern with a seven-year record of 131–97.

== Roster ==
2020–21 Georgia Southern Eagles men's basketball team
Players
Coaches

Pos.	#	Name	Height	Weight	Year	Hometown
G/F	0	Kaden Archie	6 ft 6 in (1.98 m)	215 lb (98 kg)	Jr	Dallas, Texas
G/F	1	David Viti	6 ft 5 in (1.96 m)	215 lb (98 kg)	RS So	Buford, Georgia
G	2	Elijah McCadden	6 ft 4 in (1.93 m)	210 lb (95 kg)	Jr	Rocky Mount, North Carolina
G	3	Zack Bryant	6 ft 2 in (1.88 m)	200 lb (91 kg)	Sr	Hastings, Florida
G	4	Kamari Brown	6 ft 3 in (1.91 m)	190 lb (86 kg)	Jr	Tallahassee, Florida
G	5	Eric Boone	6 ft 2 in (1.88 m)	190 lb (86 kg)	Jr	Lexington, Kentucky
F	10	Cam Bryant	6 ft 7 in (2.01 m)	215 lb (98 kg)	Fr	Camilla, Georgia
F	11	Mackenzie McFatten	6 ft 8 in (2.03 m)	210 lb (95 kg)	RS Fr	Douglas, Georgia
F	12	Andrei Savrasov	6 ft 7 in (2.01 m)	225 lb (102 kg)	RS So	Orenburg, Russia
G/F	13	Gedi Juozapaitis	6 ft 4 in (1.93 m)	210 lb (95 kg)	Jr	London, England
F	14	Ralueke Orizu	6 ft 8 in (2.03 m)	205 lb (93 kg)	RS Jr	Atlanta, Georgia
G	21	Eito Yuminami	5 ft 6 in (1.68 m)	160 lb (73 kg)	Jr	Mooresville, North Carolina
G	23	Grant Weatherford	6 ft 2 in (1.88 m)	205 lb (93 kg)	RS Sr	Cicero, Indiana
F/C	24	Prince Toyambi	6 ft 7 in (2.01 m)	235 lb (107 kg)	RS So	Kinshasa, DR Congo
G	33	JeMar Lincoln	6 ft 1 in (1.85 m)	200 lb (91 kg)	RS Jr	Waycross, Georgia
G	34	Jacob Sowers	6 ft 0 in (1.83 m)	185 lb (84 kg)	Sr	Alpharetta, Georgia
C	44	Fred Odhiambo	6 ft 11 in (2.11 m)	210 lb (95 kg)	Jr	Nairobi, Kenya
G		Will Dillard	6 ft 3 in (1.91 m)	205 lb (93 kg)	Jr	Greensboro, North Carolina

Head coach

- Brian Burg (UNC Wilmington)

Assistant coach(es)

- Chris Shumate (Murray State)
- Shawn Forrest (Arkansas–Pine Bluff)
- Tim MacAllister (Murray State)

Legend

- (C) Team captain
- (S) Suspended
- (I) Ineligible
- (W) Walk-on
- Injured
- Current redshirt

Roster
Last update: November 26, 2020

== Schedule and results ==
Date time, TV	Rank^{#}	Opponent^{#}	Result	Record	High points	High rebounds	High assists	Site (attendance) city, state
Non-conference Regular season
November 25, 2020*; 1:00 pm, ESPN+		Florida National	W 97–65	1–0	16 – Archie	10 – McCadden	6 – C. Bryant	Hanner Fieldhouse (202); Statesboro, GA
November 28, 2020*; 4:00 pm, ESPN+		Coastal Georgia	W 91–79	2–0	14 – Archie	8 – Savrasov	5 – Boone	Hanner Fieldhouse (263); Statesboro, GA
December 5, 2020*; 6:00 pm, ESPN+		at USC Upstate	W 72–69	3–0	23 – Archie	8 – Boone	4 – McCadden	G. B. Hodge Center (140); Spartanburg, SC
December 11, 2020*; ESPN+		at Davidson	L 45–77	3–1	16 – Z. Bryant	4 – Archie	2 – Z. Bryant	John M. Belk Arena; Davidson, NC
December 13, 2020*; 6:00 pm, ESPN+		Mercer	L 75–77	3–2	24 – Z. Bryant	9 – Toyambi	6 – Boone	Hanner Fieldhouse (459); Statesboro, GA
December 15, 2020*; 6:00 pm, ESPN+		Carver	W 92–27	4–2	12 – Viti	7 – Odhiambo	5 – Boone	Hanner Fieldhouse (305); Statesboro, GA
December 19, 2020*; 7:00 pm		at FIU	W 103–99 ^{2OT}	5–2	29 – Boone	7 – McCadden	4 – McCadden	Ocean Bank Convocation Center (172); Miami, FL
December 20, 2020*; 7:00 pm		vs. Carver	W 119–43	6–2	29 – C. Bryant	10 – Orizu	4 – Z. Bryant	Ocean Bank Convocation Center; Miami, FL
December 22, 2020*; 7:00 pm, ESPN+		at Florida Gulf Coast	L 60–73	6–3	23 – Boone	8 – McCadden	3 – McCadden	Alico Arena (813); Fort Myers, FL
Conference Regular season
January 1, 2021; 6:00 pm, ESPN+		South Alabama	L 59–88	6–4 (0–1)	14 – McCadden	6 – TEAM	3 – Archie	Hanner Fieldhouse (508); Statesboro, GA
January 2, 2021; 3:00 pm, ESPN+		South Alabama	W 62–49	7–4 (1–1)	12 – McCadden	10 – McCadden	2 – Archie	Hanner Fieldhouse (244); Statesboro, GA
January 8, 2021; 6:00 pm, ESPN+		at Appalachian State	L 63–66	7–5 (1–2)	12 – Toyambi	11 – Toyambi	2 – Archie	Holmes Center (85); Boone, NC
January 9, 2021; 6:00 pm, ESPN+		at Appalachian State	L 71–77	7–6 (1–3)	14 – McCadden	6 – TEAM	7 – Boone	HHolmes Center (85); Boone, NC
January 15, 2021; 6:00 pm, ESPN+		Troy	W 67–64 ^{OT}	8–6 (2–3)	12 – Z. Bryant	6 – Toyambi	3 – Z. Bryant	Hanner Fieldhouse (783); Statesboro, GA
January 16, 2021; 3:00 pm, ESPN+		Troy	W 63–56	9–6 (3–3)	17 – Z. Bryant	5 – Savrasov	6 – Boone	Hanner Fieldhouse (505); Statesboro, GA
January 22, 2021; 7:00 pm, ESPN+		at South Alabama	W 84–75 ^{OT}	10–6 (4–3)	18 – Juozapaitis	9 – McCadden	4 – Archie	Mitchell Center (1,030); Mobile, AL
January 23, 2021; 5:00 pm, ESPN+		at South Alabama	L 48–62	10–7 (4–4)	16 – McCadden	8 – McCadden	5 – McCadden	Mitchell Center (961); Mobile, AL
January 29, 2021; 6:00 pm, ESPN+		Coastal Carolina	L 62–79	10–8 (4–5)	17 – Boone	7 – McCadden	2 – Z. Bryant	Hanner Fieldhouse (811); Statesboro, GA
January 30, 2021; 3:00 pm, ESPN+		Coastal Carolina	W 61–58	11–8 (5–5)	15 – Brown	6 – Toyambi	4 – Z. Bryant	Hanner Fieldhouse (536); Statesboro, GA
February 5, 2021; 7:00 pm, ESPN+		at Troy	L 56–68	11–9 (5–6)	16 – Boone	8 – Toyambi	4 – Z. Bryant	Trojan Arena (1,003); Troy, AL
February 6, 2021; 5:00 pm, ESPN+		Troy	W 79–64	12–9 (6–6)	14 – Savrasov	8 – Toyambi	4 – Boone	Trojan Arena (985); Troy, AL
February 11, 2021; 6:00 p.m., ESPN+		at Georgia State; Modern Day Hate	L 75–79	12–10 (6–7)	21 – Z. Bryant	6 – Toyambi	5 – Brown	GSU Sports Arena (1,071); Atlanta, GA
February 13, 2021; 3:00 p.m., ESPN+		Georgia State	Canceled due to weather concerns.					Hanner Fieldhouse; Statesboro, GA
February 19, 2021; 6:00 pm, ESPN+		at Coastal Carolina	Canceled due to weather concerns.					HTC Center; Conway, SC
February 21, 2021; 1:00 pm, ESPN+		at Coastal Carolina	L 55–65	12–11 (6–8)	12 – McCadden	5 – Savrasov	3 – Boone	HTC Center (147); Conway, SC
February 26, 2021; 6:00 pm, ESPN+		Appalachian State	L 78–84 ^{2OT}	12–12 (6–9)	20 – Bryant	12 – Toyambi	4 – McCadden	Hanner Fieldhouse; Statesboro, GA
February 27, 2021; 3:00 pm, ESPN+		Appalachian State	W 65–57	13–12 (7–9)	18 – McCadden	9 – McCadden	4 – Bryant	Hanner Fieldhouse; Statesboro, GA
Sun Belt tournament
March 5, 2021; 6:00 pm, ESPN+	(E5)	vs. (W4) Arkansas State; First round	L 58–62	13–13	12 – Juozapaitis	10 – McCadden	3 – Juozapaitis	Hartsell Arena; Pensacola, FL
*Non-conference game. ^{#}Rankings from AP Poll. (#) Tournament seedings in parentheses. All times are in Eastern.
