= 2020–21 Little Rock Trojans men's basketball team =

American college basketball season

2020–21 Little Rock Trojans men's basketball
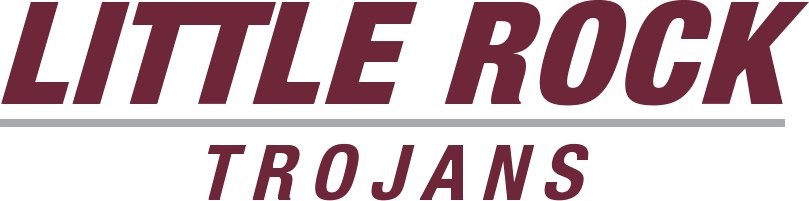
- Conference: Sun Belt Conference
- West Division
- Record: 11–15 (7–11 Sun Belt)
- Head coach: Darrell Walker (3rd season)
- Assistant coaches: Charles Baker; Preston Laird
- Home arena: Jack Stephens Center

2020–21 Sun Belt Conference men's basketball standings
	Conf.				Overall
Team	W		L	PCT	W		L	PCT
East
Georgia State	8	–	4	.667	16	–	6	.727
Coastal Carolina	9	–	5	.643	18	–	8	.692
South Alabama	10	–	7	.588	17	–	11	.607
Appalachian State †	7	–	8	.467	17	–	12	.586
Georgia Southern	7	–	9	.438	13	–	13	.500
Troy	4	–	12	.250	11	–	17	.393
West
Texas State	12	–	3	.800	18	–	7	.720
Louisiana	10	–	7	.588	17	–	9	.654
UT Arlington	9	–	8	.529	13	–	13	.500
Arkansas State	7	–	8	.467	11	–	13	.458
Little Rock	7	–	11	.389	11	–	15	.423
Louisiana–Monroe	5	–	13	.278	7	–	19	.269
† 2021 Sun Belt Tournament winner

The 2020–21 Little Rock Trojans men's basketball team represented the University of Arkansas at Little Rock in the 2020–21 NCAA Division I men's basketball season. The Trojans, led by third-year head coach Darrell Walker, played their home games at the Jack Stephens Center in Little Rock, Arkansas as members of the Sun Belt Conference. With the creation of divisions to cut down on travel due to the COVID-19 pandemic, they played in the West Division.

== Previous season ==
The Trojans finished the 2019–20 season 21–10, 15–5 in Sun Belt play to win the Sun Belt regular season championship. They were the No. 1 seed in the Sun Belt tournament, however, the tournament was cancelled amid the COVID-19 pandemic. Due to the Sun Belt Tournament cancellation, they were awarded the Sun Belt's automatic bid to the NCAA tournament. However, the NCAA Tournament was also cancelled due to the same outbreak.

== Roster ==
2020–21 Little Rock Trojans men's basketball team
Players
Coaches

Pos.	#	Name	Height	Weight	Year	Hometown
G	0	Ben Coupet Jr.	6 ft 7 in (2.01 m)	185 lb (84 kg)	RS Sr	Chicago, Illinois
G	1	Markquis Nowell	5 ft 7 in (1.7 m)	155 lb (70 kg)	Jr	Harlem, New York
G	2	Alsean Evans	6 ft 6 in (1.98 m)	195 lb (88 kg)	RS Jr	Lakeland, Florida
G	3	Isaiah Palermo	6 ft 5 in (1.96 m)	185 lb (84 kg)	So	Kissimmee, Florida
G	5	CJ White	6 ft 5 in (1.96 m)	215 lb (98 kg)	Jr	Little Rock, Arkansas
G	10	Marko Lukic	6 ft 7 in (2.01 m)	195 lb (88 kg)	So	Belgrade, Serbia
G	11	Marko Andric	6 ft 1 in (1.85 m)	180 lb (82 kg)	Fr	Belgrade, Serbia
G	12	Terrell Curtis II	5 ft 10 in (1.78 m)	165 lb (75 kg)	Jr	Maumelle, Arkansas
G	15	Sydney Agudah	6 ft 2 in (1.88 m)	175 lb (79 kg)	Sr	Fort Worth, Texas
F	25	Nikola Marić	6 ft 10 in (2.08 m)	250 lb (113 kg)	Jr	Trebinje, Bosnia and Herzegovina
F	32	Kris Bankston	6 ft 8 in (2.03 m)	220 lb (100 kg)	RS Jr	DeWitt, Arkansas
G	33	Jovan Stulic	6 ft 5 in (1.96 m)	205 lb (93 kg)	So	Prigrevica, Serbia
G/F	35	Yacine Toumi	6 ft 9 in (2.06 m)	200 lb (91 kg)	Fr	Meudon, France
F	44	Ruot Monyyong	6 ft 10 in (2.08 m)	190 lb (86 kg)	Sr	Nashville, Tennessee
C	52	Admir Besovic	7 ft 0 in (2.13 m)	240 lb (109 kg)	Sr	Sarajevo, Bosnia and Herzegovina

Head coach

- Darrell Walker (Arkansas)

Assistant coach(es)

- Charles Baker (Eastern Kentucky)
- Preston Laird (Memphis)

Legend

- (C) Team captain
- (S) Suspended
- (I) Ineligible
- (W) Walk-on
- Injured
- Current redshirt

Roster
Last update: November 27, 2020

== Schedule and results ==
Date time, TV	Rank^{#}	Opponent^{#}	Result	Record	High points	High rebounds	High assists	Site (attendance) city, state
Non-conference regular season
November 25, 2020*; 12:00 pm, ESPN3		vs. Prairie View A&M; Wade Houston Tipoff Classic	W 71–66	1–0	17 – Nowell	10 – Monyyong	5 – Nowell	KFC Yum! Center; Louisville, KY
November 27, 2020*; 6:00 pm, ESPN3		vs. UNC Greensboro; Wade Houston Tipoff Classic	L 70–77	1–1	21 – Marić	6 – Coupet Jr.	6 – Nowell	KFC Yum! Center; Louisville, KY
November 30, 2020*; 3:00 pm, ESPN3		vs. Duquesne; Wade Houston Tipoff Classic	W 76–66	2–1	16 – Maric	13 – Monyyong	11 – Nowell	KFC Yum! Center (125); Louisville, KY
December 3, 2020*; 3:00 pm, ESPN3		vs. Winthrop; Wade Houston Tipoff Classic	L 75–80	2–2	25 – Nowell	12 – Monyyong	10 – Nowell	KFC Yum! Center (110); Louisville, KY
December 4, 2020*; 6:00 pm, ESPN3		vs. Western Kentucky; Wade Houston Tipoff Classic	Cancelled due to the COVID-19 pandemic					KFC Yum! Center; Louisville, KY
December 6, 2020*; 2:00 pm, ESPN+		Central Arkansas; Governor's I-40 Showdown	W 86–83	3–2	19 – Nowell	13 – Monyyong	13 – Nowell	Jack Stephens Center; Little Rock, AR
December 15, 2020*; 6:30 pm, ESPN+		Texas A&M-Texarkana	Cancelled due to the COVID-19 pandemic					Jack Stephens Center; Little Rock, AR
December 18, 2020*; 6:30 pm, ESPN+		Champion Christian	W 78–50	4–2	17 – Nowell	6 – Maric	10 – Nowell	Jack Stephens Center (232); Little Rock, AR
December 21, 2020*; 7:00 pm, ESPN3		at Missouri State	L 77–85	4–3	18 – Nowell	7 – Maric	7 – Nowell	JQH Arena (1,201); Springfield, MO
Sun Belt Conference regular season
January 1, 2021; 4:00 pm, ESPN+		UT Arlington	W 102–93	5–3 (1–0)	27 – Coupet Jr.	8 – Monyyong	6 – Monyyong	Jack Stephens Center (427); Little Rock, AR
January 2, 2021; 4:00 pm, ESPN+		UT Arlington	W 75–62	6–3 (2–0)	26 – Coupet Jr.	15 – Monyyong	6 – Maric	Jack Stephens Center (464); Little Rock, AR
January 8, 2021; 4:00 pm, ESPN+		at Louisiana	L 64–66	6–4 (2–1)	18 – Maric	13 – Monyyong	5 – Andric	Cajundome (457); Lafayette, LA
January 9, 2021; 4:00 pm, ESPN+		at Louisiana	W 78–76 ^{OT}	7–4 (3–1)	19 – Monyyong	16 – Monyyong	3 – Nowell	Canjudome (405); Lafayette, LA
January 15, 2021; 6:30 pm, ESPN+		Texas State	L 59–64	7–5 (3–2)	14 – Monyyong	10 – Monyyong	3 – Nowell	Jack Stephens Center (528); Little Rock, AR
January 16, 2021; 4:00 pm, ESPN+		Texas State	L 56–67	7–6 (3–3)	20 – Coupet Jr.	10 – Monyyong	4 – Andric	Jack Stephens Center (427); Little Rock, AR
January 22, 2021; 6:00 pm, ESPN+		at UT Arlington	W 66–59	8–6 (4–3)	14 – Lukic	14 – Monyyong	5 – Nowell	College Park Center (624); Arlington, TX
January 23, 2021; 4:00 pm, ESPN+		at UT Arlington	L 61–66	8–7 (4–4)	19 – Nowell	19 – Monyyong	4 – Coupet Jr.	College Park Center (624); Arlington, TX
January 29, 2021; 6:30 pm, ESPN+		Louisiana–Monroe	W 66–62	9–7 (5–4)	17 – Nowell	9 – Maric	3 – Nowell	Jack Stephens Center (547); Little Rock, AR
January 30, 2021; 4:00 pm, ESPN+		Louisiana–Monroe	W 65–49	10–7 (6–4)	18 – Maric	12 – Monyyong	6 – Nowell	Jack Stephens Center (592); Little Rock, AR
February 5, 2021; 6:00 pm, ESPN+		at Texas State	L 47–57	10–8 (6–5)	12 – Maric	11 – Monyyong	2 – Coupet Jr.	Strahan Arena (801); San Marcos, TX
February 6, 2021; 4:00 pm, ESPN+		at Texas State	L 67–77 ^{OT}	10–9 (6–6)	21 – Lukic	9 – Monyyong	6 – Coupet Jr.	Strahan Arena (758); San Marcos, TX
February 12, 2021; 7:30 pm, ESPN+		at Arkansas State	L 62–73	10–10 (6–7)	22 – Coupet Jr.	13 – Monyyong	7 – White	First National Bank Arena (819); Jonesboro, AR
February 13, 2021; 5:00 pm, ESPN+		Arkansas State	L 65–67	10–11 (6–8)	16 – Maric	8 – Coupet Jr.	4 – Coupet Jr.	Jack Stephens Center (1,021); Arlington, TX
February 21, 2021; 4:00 pm, ESPN+		at Louisiana–Monroe	L 66–78	10–12 (6–9)	24 – Maric	14 – Monyyong	4 – Maric	Fant–Ewing Coliseum (1,311); Monroe, LA
February 22, 2021; 4:00 pm, ESPN+		at Louisiana–Monroe	L 64–68	10–13 (6–10)	20 – Lukic	10 – Coupet Jr.	4 – Coupet Jr.	Fant–Ewing Coliseum (1,179); Monroe, LA
February 26, 2021; 6:30 pm, ESPN+		Louisiana	L 61–66	10–14 (6–11)	18 – Coupet Jr.	19 – Monyyong	3 – Maric	Jack Stephens Center (410); Little Rock, AR
February 27, 2021; 4:00 pm, ESPN+		Louisiana	W 69–59	11–14 (7–11)	17 – Maric	9 – Besovic	3 – Maric/Andric	Jack Stephens Center; Little Rock, AR
Sun Belt tournament
March 5, 2021; 7:30 pm, ESPN+	(W5)	vs. (E4) Appalachian State; First round	L 60–67	11–15	19 – Coupet Jr.	10 – Monyyong	3 – Coupet Jr.	Hartsell Arena (148); Pensacola, FL
*Non-conference game. ^{#}Rankings from AP Poll. (#) Tournament seedings in parentheses. All times are in Central.
