= 2020–21 South Alabama Jaguars men's basketball team =

American college basketball season

2020–21 South Alabama Jaguars men's basketball
- Conference: Sun Belt Conference
- East Division
- Record: 17–11 (10–7 Sun Belt)
- Head coach: Richie Riley (3rd season)
- Assistant coaches: Adam Howard; Amorrow Morgan; Tyler Parker
- Home arena: Mitchell Center

2020–21 Sun Belt Conference men's basketball standings
| | Conf. | | | | Overall |
| Team | W | | L | PCT | W | | L | PCT |
|---|---|---|---|---|---|---|---|---|
East
| Georgia State | 8 | – | 4 | .667 | 16 | – | 6 | .727 |
| Coastal Carolina | 9 | – | 5 | .643 | 18 | – | 8 | .692 |
| South Alabama | 10 | – | 7 | .588 | 17 | – | 11 | .607 |
| Appalachian State † | 7 | – | 8 | .467 | 17 | – | 12 | .586 |
| Georgia Southern | 7 | – | 9 | .438 | 13 | – | 13 | .500 |
| Troy | 4 | – | 12 | .250 | 11 | – | 17 | .393 |
West
| Texas State | 12 | – | 3 | .800 | 18 | – | 7 | .720 |
| Louisiana | 10 | – | 7 | .588 | 17 | – | 9 | .654 |
| UT Arlington | 9 | – | 8 | .529 | 13 | – | 13 | .500 |
| Arkansas State | 7 | – | 8 | .467 | 11 | – | 13 | .458 |
| Little Rock | 7 | – | 11 | .389 | 11 | – | 15 | .423 |
| Louisiana–Monroe | 5 | – | 13 | .278 | 7 | – | 19 | .269 |
† 2021 Sun Belt Tournament winner

The 2020–21 South Alabama Jaguars men's basketball team represented the University of South Alabama during the 2020–21 NCAA Division I men's basketball season. The Jaguars, led by third-year head coach Richie Riley, played their home games at the Mitchell Center in Mobile, Alabama as members in the Sun Belt Conference. With the creation of divisions to cut down on travel due to the ongoing COVID-19 pandemic, they played in the East division. They finished the season 17–11, 19–7 to finish in third place in the East division. They defeated Louisiana–Monroe in the first round of the Sun Belt tournament before losing to Louisiana in the quarterfinals.

== Previous season ==
The Jaguars finished the 2019–20 season 20–11, 13–7 in Sun Belt play to finish in a tie for second place. They were set to be the No. 2 seed in the Sun Belt tournament, however, the tournament was canceled due to the COVID-19 pandemic.

== Roster ==
2020–21 South Alabama Jaguars men's basketball team
Players
Coaches

| Pos. | # | Name | Height | Weight | Year | Previous school | Hometown |
|---|---|---|---|---|---|---|---|
| F | 0 | KK Curry | 6 ft 6 in (1.98 m) | 195 lb (88 kg) | So | Cleveland HS | Cleveland, Tennessee |
| G | 1 | Andrew Anderson | 6 ft 0 in (1.83 m) | 160 lb (73 kg) | Fr | Tipton-Rosemark Academy | Millington, Tennessee |
| G | 3 | Tyreke Locure | 6 ft 0 in (1.83 m) | 165 lb (75 kg) | So | North HS | New Orleans, Louisiana |
| F | 4 | Kayo Goncalves | 6 ft 8 in (2.03 m) | 212 lb (96 kg) | GS | SE Oklahoma State | Rio de Janeiro, Brazil |
| G | 12 | Michael Flowers | 6 ft 1 in (1.85 m) | 189 lb (86 kg) | Sr | Western Michigan | Southfield, Michigan |
| G | 14 | Adam Sizemore | 5 ft 9 in (1.75 m) | 166 lb (75 kg) | So | North Laurel HS | London, Kentucky |
| G | 22 | Sam Iorio | 6 ft 7 in (2.01 m) | 221 lb (100 kg) | Jr | American | Allentown, Pennsylvania |
| F | 25 | Jamal West | 6 ft 5 in (1.96 m) | 224 lb (102 kg) | Fr | St. Frances Academy | Baltimore, Maryland |
| G | 30 | A.C. Kelly | 6 ft 6 in (1.98 m) | 190 lb (86 kg) | So | Parkland HS | Allentown, Pennsylvania |
| F | 42 | Zondrick Garrett | 6 ft 7 in (2.01 m) | 202 lb (92 kg) | Fr | Oxford HS | Oxford, Alabama |
| G | 50 | John Pettway | 6 ft 3 in (1.91 m) | 189 lb (86 kg) | RS Sr | Keith HS | Safford, Alabama |
| G | | Tyrell Jones (redshirt) | 6 ft 1 in (1.85 m) | 186 lb (84 kg) | RS So | Auburn | Chicago, Illinois |
| G | | Charles Manning Jr. (redshirt) | 6 ft 4 in (1.93 m) | 193 lb (88 kg) | RS Jr | LSU | Riverhead, New York |
| F | | Diante Smith (redshirt) | 6 ft 6 in (1.98 m) | 189 lb (86 kg) | RS So | TCU | Fort Walton Beach, Florida |

Head coach

- Richie Riley (Eastern Kentucky)

Assistant coach(es)

- Adam Howard (Western Kentucky)
- Amorrow Morgan (Idaho State)
- Tyler Parker (Faulkner University)
- Mikel Kosich (Montana State University-Billings)

Legend

- (C) Team captain
- (S) Suspended
- (I) Ineligible
- (W) Walk-on
- Injured
- Current redshirt

Roster
Last update: November 27, 2020

== Schedule and results ==
| Date time, TV | Rank^{#} | Opponent^{#} | Result | Record | High points | High rebounds | High assists | Site (attendance) city, state |
Non-conference Regular Season
| Nov 25, 2020*; 6:00 pm, ESPN+ | | Florida Atlantic; Goldie and Herman Ungar Memorial Tournament | W 68–66 | 1–0 | 20 – Flowers | 9 – Locure | 3 – Iorio | Mitchell Center (945); Mobile, AL |
| Nov 27, 2020*; 6:00 pm, ESPN+ | | Mobile; Goldie and Herman Ungar Memorial Tournament | W 95–75 | 2–0 | 25 – Flowers | 9 – West | 4 – Locure | Mitchell Center (983); Mobile, AL |
| Nov 29, 2020*; 4:00 pm, ESPN+ | | Jacksonville State; Goldie and Herman Ungar Memorial Tournament | L 73–77 | 2–1 | 19 – Flowers | 6 – Tied | 6 – Flowers | Mitchell Center (910); Mobile, AL |
| Dec 1, 2020*; 6:00 pm, ESPN+ | | Emmanuel | W 86–47 | 3–1 | 17 – Flowers | 9 – West | 5 – Tied | Mitchell Center (780); Mobile, AL |
| Dec 4, 2020*; 8:00 pm, SECN | | at Auburn | L 81–90 | 3–2 | 29 – Flowers | 4 – 3 tied' | 3 – Flowers | Auburn Arena (1,824); Auburn, Alabama |
| Dec 8, 2020*; 6:00 ap, ESPN+ | | William Carey | W 80–67 | 4–2 | 26 – Flowers | 5 – Tied | 7 – Locure | Mitchell Center (812); Mobile, AL |
| Dec 12, 2020*; 2:00 pm | | at Southern Miss | W 76–75 | 5–2 | 18 – Tied | 8 – Goncalves | 6 – Locure | Reed Green Coliseum; Hattiesburg, MS |
| Dec 16, 2020*; 6:00 pm, ESPN+ | | Flagler | W 103–81 | 6–2 | 22 – Locure | 10 – Goncalves | 7 – Pettway | Mitchell Center (821); Mobile, AL |
| Dec 19, 2020*; 2:00 pm | | at Alabama A&M | L 90–93 | 6–3 | 26 – Flowers | 9 – Curry | 3 – Flowers | Elmore Gymnasium (57); Huntsville, AL |
Sun Belt regular season
| Jan 1, 2021; 5:00 pm, ESPN+ | | at Georgia Southern | W 88–59 | 7–3 (1–0) | 26 – Flowers | 10 – Goncalves | 5 – Flowers | Hanner Fieldhouse (508); Statesboro, GA |
| Jan 2, 2021; 2:00 pm, ESPN+ | | at Georgia Southern | L 49–62 | 7–4 (1–1) | 18 – Flowers | 12 – West | 2 – Iorio | Hanner Fieldhouse (244); Statesboro, GA |
| Jan 8, 2021; 5:00 pm, ESPN+ | | at Coastal Carolina | L 65–78 | 7–5 (1–2) | 19 – Curry | 9 – Curry | 5 – Flowers | HTC Center (165); Conway, SC |
| Jan 9, 2021; 2:00 pm, ESPN+ | | Coastal Carolina | L 69–83 | 7–6 (1–3) | 29 – Flowers | 6 – West | 4 – Flowers | HTC Center (147); Conway, SC |
| Jan 15, 2021; 6:00 pm, ESPN+ | | Appalachian State | W 73–64 | 8–6 (2–3) | 31 – Flowers | 13 – West | 3 – Pettway | Mitchell Center (871); Mobile, AL |
| Jan 16, 2021; 4:00 pm, ESPN+ | | Appalachian State | L 77–83 | 8–7 (2–4) | 27 – Flowers | 10 – West | 7 – Flowers | Mitchell Center (867); Mobile, AL |
| Jan 22, 2021; 6:00 pm, ESPN+ | | Georgia Southern | L 75–84 ^{OT} | 8–8 (2–5) | 32 – Flowers | 7 – Goncalves | 3 – Flowers | Mitchell Center (1,030); Mobile, AL |
| Jan 23, 2021; 4:00 pm, ESPN+ | | Georgia Southern | W 62–48 | 9–8 (3–5) | 19 – Locure | 11 – Goncalves | 3 – Flowers | Mitchell Center (961); Mobile, AL |
| January 29, 2021; 7:00 p.m., ESPN+ | | Georgia State | Postponed due to COVID-19 issues | | | | | GSU Sports Arena; Atlanta, GA |
| January 30, 2021; 4:00 p.m., ESPN+ | | Georgia State | Postponed due to COVID-19 issues | | | | | GSU Sports Arena; Atlanta, GA |
| Feb 5, 2021; 6:00 pm, ESPN+ | | Coastal Carolina | W 71–65 | 10–8 (4–5) | 28 – Flowers | 8 – Iorio | 6 – Flowers | Mitchell Center (871); Mobile, AL |
| Feb 6, 2021; 4:00 pm, ESPN+ | | at Coastal Carolina | W 70–66 | 11–8 (5–5) | 22 – Locure | 10 – West | 4 – Flowers | Mitchell Center (1,027); Mobile, AL |
| Feb 9, 2021; 1:00 pm, ESPN+ | | at Georgia State | W 70–67 | 12–8 (6–5) | 18 – Iorio | 6 – Locure | 4 – Locure | GSU Sports Arena (1,135); Atlanta, GA |
| Feb 11, 2021; 6:00 pm, ESPN+ | | Troy | W 73–70 | 13–8 (7–5) | 18 – Flowers | 7 – Goncalves | 7 – Locure | Mitchell Center (1,302); Mobile, AL |
| Feb 13, 2021; 4:00 pm, ESPN+ | | at Troy | W 58–51 | 14–8 (8–5) | 14 – Goncalves | 15 – Iorio | 6 – Locure | Trojan Arena (1,047); Troy, AL |
| Feb 19, 2021; 5:00 pm, ESPN+ | | at Appalachian State | W 65–63 | 15–8 (9–5) | 19 – Flowers | 9 – Flowers | 7 – Flowers | Holmes Center (85); Boone, NC |
| Feb 20, 2021; 3:00 pm, ESPN+ | | at Appalachian State | W 56–54 | 16–8 (10–5) | 18 – Goncalves | 10 – Goncalves | 4 – Flowers | Holmes Center (85); Boone, NC |
| Feb 26, 2021; 6:00 pm, ESPN2 | | Georgia State; Rescheduled from January 29 | L 81–84 | 16–9 (10–6) | 32 – Flowers | 10 – West | 5 – Pettway | Mitchell Center (1,440); Mobile, AL |
| Feb 27, 2021; 4:00 pm, ESPN+ | | Georgia State; Rescheduled from January 30 | L 73–82 | 16–10 (10–7) | 30 – Pettway | 6 – Flowers | 5 – Flowers | Mitchell Center (1,370); Mobile, AL |
Sun Belt tournament
| March 5, 2021; 5:30 pm, ESPN+ | (E3) | vs. (W6) Louisiana–Monroe; First round | W 80–72 | 17–10 | 34 – Flowers | 10 – Pettway | 4 – Flowers | Pensacola Bay Center; Pensacola, FL |
| March 6, 2021; 5:00 pm, ESPN+ | (E3) | vs. (W2) Louisiana; Quarterfinals | L 68–79 | 17–11 | 16 – Pettway | 7 – West | 7 – Locure | Hartsell Arena; Pensacola, FL |
*Non-conference game. ^{#}Rankings from AP Poll. (#) Tournament seedings in parentheses. All times are in Central Time.
