= 2021 Sun Belt Conference men's basketball tournament =

- Classification: Division I
- Season: 2020–21
- Teams: 12
- Site: Pensacola Bay Center & Hartsell Center at Pensacola State College (1st, Qrts, Semis, Championship); Pensacola, Florida
- Champions: Appalachian State (1st title)
- Winning coach: Dustin Kerns (1st title)
- MVP: Michael Almonacy (Appalachian State)
- Television: ESPN+, ESPN2

2020–21 Sun Belt Conference men's basketball standings
| | Conf. | | | | Overall |
| Team | W | | L | PCT | W | | L | PCT |
|---|---|---|---|---|---|---|---|---|
East
| Georgia State | 8 | – | 4 | .667 | 16 | – | 6 | .727 |
| Coastal Carolina | 9 | – | 5 | .643 | 18 | – | 8 | .692 |
| South Alabama | 10 | – | 7 | .588 | 17 | – | 11 | .607 |
| Appalachian State † | 7 | – | 8 | .467 | 17 | – | 12 | .586 |
| Georgia Southern | 7 | – | 9 | .438 | 13 | – | 13 | .500 |
| Troy | 4 | – | 12 | .250 | 11 | – | 17 | .393 |
West
| Texas State | 12 | – | 3 | .800 | 18 | – | 7 | .720 |
| Louisiana | 10 | – | 7 | .588 | 17 | – | 9 | .654 |
| UT Arlington | 9 | – | 8 | .529 | 13 | – | 13 | .500 |
| Arkansas State | 7 | – | 8 | .467 | 11 | – | 13 | .458 |
| Little Rock | 7 | – | 11 | .389 | 11 | – | 15 | .423 |
| Louisiana–Monroe | 5 | – | 13 | .278 | 7 | – | 19 | .269 |
† 2021 Sun Belt Tournament winner

The 2021 Sun Belt Conference men's basketball tournament was the postseason men's basketball tournament for Sun Belt Conference during the 2020–21 NCAA Division I men's basketball season. All tournament games were played at Pensacola Bay Center & the Hartsell Center at Pensacola State College between March 5–8. The winner received the Sun Belt's automatic bid to the 2021 NCAA tournament.

== Seeds ==
All 12 conference teams qualified for the tournament. Due to the COVID-19 pandemic, teams were seeded by their place in their division. The top two teams from each division received a bye into the quarterfinals.

| Seed | School | Conference | Tiebreaker |
|---|---|---|---|
| #1 East | Georgia State | 8–4 | |
| #1 West | Texas State | 12–3 | |
| #2 East | Coastal Carolina | 9–5 | |
| #2 West | Louisiana | 10–7 | |
| #3 East | South Alabama | 10–7 | |
| #3 West | UT Arlington | 9–8 | |
| #4 East | Appalachian State | 7–8 | |
| #4 West | Arkansas State | 7–8 | |
| #5 East | Georgia Southern | 7–9 | |
| #5 West | Little Rock | 7–11 | |
| #6 East | Troy | 4–12 | |
| #6 West | UL-Monroe | 5–13 | |

== Schedule ==
| Game | Time | Matchup | Score | Television |
First round – Friday, March 5 – Pensacola Bay Center & Hartsell Center, Pensacola, FL
| 1 | 5:00 pm | W4 Arkansas State vs. E5 Georgia Southern | 62–58 | ESPN+ |
| 2 | 5:30 pm | E3 South Alabama vs. W6 UL-Monroe | 80–72 | ESPN+ |
| 3 | 8:00 pm | W3 UT Arlington vs. E6 Troy | 86–91 | ESPN+ |
| 4 | 8:30 pm | E4 Appalachian State vs. W5 Little Rock | 67–60 | ESPN+ |
Quarterfinals – Saturday, March 6 – Pensacola Bay Center & Hartsell Center, Pensacola, FL
| 5 | 5:30 pm | E1 Georgia State vs. W4 Arkansas State | 71–68 | ESPN+ |
| 6 | 5:00 pm | W2 Louisiana vs. E3 South Alabama | 79–68 | ESPN+ |
| 7 | 7:30 pm | E2 Coastal Carolina vs. E6 Troy | 86–68 | ESPN+ |
| 8 | 8:00 pm | W1 Texas State vs. E4 Appalachian State | 73–76^{OT} | ESPN+ |
Semifinals – Sunday, March 7 – Pensacola Bay Center, Pensacola, FL
| 9 | 5:30 pm | E1 Georgia State vs. W2 Louisiana | 84–73 | ESPN+ |
| 10 | 8:00 pm | E2 Coastal Carolina vs. E4 Appalachian State | 61–64^{OT} | ESPN+ |
Championship – Monday, March 8 – Pensacola Bay Center, Pensacola, FL
| 11 | 6:00 pm | E1 Georgia State vs. E4 Appalachian State | 73–80 | ESPN2 |
Game times in CT. Rankings denote tournament seed

== Bracket ==
First round Friday, March 5
W4 | Arkansas State | 62
E5 | Georgia Southern | 58
E3 | South Alabama | 80
W6 | Louisiana-Monroe | 72
E4 | Appalachian State | 67
W5 | Little Rock | 60
W3 | UT Arlington | 86
E6 | Troy | 91

Quarterfinals; Saturday, March 6
E1 | Georgia State | 71
W4 | Arkansas State | 68
W2 | Louisiana | 79
E3 | South Alabama | 68
W1 | Texas State | 73
E4 | Appalachian State | 76*
E2 | Coastal Carolina | 86
E6 | Troy | 68

Semifinals; Sunday, March 7
E1 | Georgia State | 84
W2 | Louisiana | 73
E4 | Appalachian State | 64*
E2 | Coastal Carolina | 61

Championship; Monday, March 8
E1 | Georgia State | 73
E4 | Appalachian State | 80

* denotes overtime period

== See also ==
2021 Sun Belt Conference women's basketball tournament
