= 2020–21 Coastal Carolina Chanticleers men's basketball team =

American college basketball season

2020–21 Coastal Carolina Chanticleers men's basketball

CBI, Runner–up
- Conference: Sun Belt Conference
- East Division
- Record: 18–8 (9–5 Sun Belt)
- Head coach: Cliff Ellis (14th season)
- Associate head coach: Benny Moss
- Assistant coaches: Patrice Days; Elwyn McRoy
- Home arena: HTC Center

2020–21 Sun Belt Conference men's basketball standings
	Conf.				Overall
Team	W		L	PCT	W		L	PCT
East
Georgia State	8	–	4	.667	16	–	6	.727
Coastal Carolina	9	–	5	.643	18	–	8	.692
South Alabama	10	–	7	.588	17	–	11	.607
Appalachian State †	7	–	8	.467	17	–	12	.586
Georgia Southern	7	–	9	.438	13	–	13	.500
Troy	4	–	12	.250	11	–	17	.393
West
Texas State	12	–	3	.800	18	–	7	.720
Louisiana	10	–	7	.588	17	–	9	.654
UT Arlington	9	–	8	.529	13	–	13	.500
Arkansas State	7	–	8	.467	11	–	13	.458
Little Rock	7	–	11	.389	11	–	15	.423
Louisiana–Monroe	5	–	13	.278	7	–	19	.269
† 2021 Sun Belt Tournament winner

The 2020–21 Coastal Carolina Chanticleers men's basketball team represented Coastal Carolina University in the 2020–21 NCAA Division I men's basketball season. The Chanticleers, led by 14th-year head coach Cliff Ellis, played their home games at the HTC Center in Conway, South Carolina as members of the Sun Belt Conference. With the creation of divisions to cut down on travel due to the COVID-19 pandemic, they played in the East Division. they finished the season 18–8, 9–5 in Sun Belt play to finish in second place in the East Division. They defeated Troy in the quarterfinals of the Sun Belt tournament before losing to Appalachian State in the semifinals. They received a bid to the College Basketball Invitational where they defeated Bryant and Stetson to advance to the CBI championship game. There they lost to Pepperdine.

== Previous season ==
The Chanticleers finished the 2019–20 season 16–17, 8–12 in Sun Belt play to finish in a three-way tie for eighth place. They defeated UT Arlington in the first round of the Sun Belt tournament before losing in the second round to Appalachian State.

== Roster ==
2020–21 Coastal Carolina Chanticleers men's basketball team
Players
Coaches

Pos.	#	Name	Height	Weight	Year	Hometown
G	0	DeAnthony Tipler	5 ft 10 in (1.78 m)	175 lb (79 kg)	Jr	Ashland, Mississippi
G	1	Tyrik Dixon	6 ft 1 in (1.85 m)	185 lb (84 kg)	Sr	Bentonville, Arkansas
G	2	Garrick Green	6 ft 6 in (1.98 m)	215 lb (98 kg)	Sr	Baton Rouge, Louisiana
G	3	DeVante' Jones	6 ft 1 in (1.85 m)	200 lb (91 kg)	Jr	New Orleans, Louisiana
G	4	Kevin Williamson	6 ft 5 in (1.96 m)	200 lb (91 kg)	Jr	Aiken, South Carolina
F	5	Daivon Stephens	6 ft 7 in (2.01 m)	210 lb (95 kg)	Jr	Pittsburgh, Pennsylvania
G	10	Ebrima Dibba	6 ft 6 in (1.98 m)	205 lb (93 kg)	RS So	Bredäng, Skärholmen, Sweden
F	11	Tim Ceaser	6 ft 9 in (2.06 m)	200 lb (91 kg)	So	Marion, Arkansas
G	13	Mason Grigg	6 ft 1 in (1.85 m)	180 lb (82 kg)	Fr	Rock Hill, South Carolina
G	14	Malik LeGania	6 ft 5 in (1.96 m)	180 lb (82 kg)	Jr	New Orleans, Louisiana
F	15	Isaac Hippolyte	6 ft 7 in (2.01 m)	205 lb (93 kg)	Jr	Spring Valley, New York
F	20	Ahmard Harvey	6 ft 7 in (2.01 m)	190 lb (86 kg)	So	Freeport, Bahamas
G	21	Jalen Milner	6 ft 1 in (1.85 m)	180 lb (82 kg)	So	Milledgeville, Georgia
G	24	DeShawn Thomas	6 ft 10 in (2.08 m)	220 lb (100 kg)	Jr	Columbia, South Carolina
F	32	Hosana Kitenge	6 ft 7 in (2.01 m)	270 lb (122 kg)	So	Crawley, West Sussex, England
C	44	Essam Mostafa	6 ft 9 in (2.06 m)	250 lb (113 kg)	RS Fr	Cairo, Egypt

Head coach

- Cliff Ellis (Florida State)

Assistant coach(es)

- Benny Moss (Charlotte)
- Patrice Days (New Orleans)
- Elwyn McRoy (Cleveland State)

Legend

- (C) Team captain
- (S) Suspended
- (I) Ineligible
- (W) Walk-on
- Injured
- Current redshirt

Roster
Last update: November 26, 2020

== Schedule and results ==
Date time, TV	Rank^{#}	Opponent^{#}	Result	Record	High points	High rebounds	High assists	Site (attendance) city, state
Non-conference regular season
November 28, 2020*; 4:00 pm, ESPN+		North Carolina Wesleyan	W 117–68	1–0	28 – Tipler	7 – Mostafa	9 – Dibba	HTC Center (133); Conway, SC
December 3, 2020*; 6:00 pm, ESPN+		Columbia International	W 113–56	2–0	25 – Mostafa	15 – Mostafa	6 – Dibba	HTC Center (129); Conway, SC
December 7, 2020*; 6:00 pm, ESPN+		North Carolina Central	W 78–71	3–0	19 – Jones	9 – Jones	7 – Dibba	HTC Center (145); Conway, SC
December 12, 2020*; 5:00 pm, ESPN+		Greensboro	W 103–45	4–0	25 – Jones	9 – Thomas	5 – Dibba	HTC Center (63); Conway, SC
December 15, 2020*; 6:00 pm, ESPN+		at Wofford	L 77–88	4–1	25 – Jones	9 – Mostafa	3 – Dibba	Jerry Richardson Indoor Stadium; Spartanburg, SC
December 17, 2020*; 6:00 pm, ESPN+		Delaware State	W 99–73	5–1	33 – Jones	12 – Mostafa	7 – Dibba	HTC Center (53); Conway, SC
December 18, 2020*; 6:00 pm, ESPN+		Alice Lloyd	W 86–63	6–1	35 – Jones	15 – Mostafa	5 – Dibba	HTC Center (63); Conway, SC
Sun Belt Conference regular season
January 1, 2021; 6:00 pm, ESPN+		Georgia State	W 81–69	7–1 (1–0)	24 – Jones	16 – Mostafa	6 – Jones	HTC Center (145); Conway, SC
January 2, 2021; 3:00 pm, ESPN+		Georgia State	L 62–70	7–2 (1–1)	22 – Jones	9 – Jones	5 – Dibba	HTC Center (117); Conway, SC
January 8, 2021; 6:00 pm, ESPN+		South Alabama	W 78–65	8–2 (2–1)	26 – Jones	14 – Mostafa	5 – Dixon	HTC Center (165); Conway, SC
January 9, 2021; 3:00 pm, ESPN+		South Alabama	W 83–69	9–2 (3–1)	28 – Green	14 – Mostafa	9 – Dibba	HTC Center (147); Conway, SC
January 16, 2021; 2:00 pm, ESPN+		at Georgia State	L 68–71	9–3 (3–2)	21 – Tipler	7 – Jones	4 – Dibba	GSU Sports Arena (1,029); Atlanta, GA
January 22, 2021; 6:00 pm, ESPN+		Troy	W 90–81	10–3 (4–2)	30 – Jones	9 – Dibba	6 – Jones	HTC Center (153); Conway, SC
January 23, 2021; 3:00 pm, ESPN+		Troy	W 70–65	11–3 (5–2)	17 – Jones	9 – Green	4 – Dixon	HTC Center (149); Conway, SC
January 29, 2021; 8:30 pm, ESPN2		at Georgia Southern	W 79–62	12–3 (6–2)	21 – Dixon	10 – Mostafa	3 – Dixon	Hanner Fieldhouse (811); Statesboro, GA
January 30, 2021; 4:00 pm, ESPN+		at Georgia Southern	L 58–61	12–4 (6–3)	27 – Jones	7 – Dibba	5 – Dibba	Hanner Fieldhouse (536); Statesboro, GA
February 5, 2021; 7:00 pm, ESPN+		at South Alabama	L 65–71	12–5 (6–4)	18 – Dixon	14 – Jones	7 – Dibba	Mitchell Center (871); Mobile, AL
February 6, 2021; 5:00 pm, ESPN+		at South Alabama	L 66–70	12–6 (6–5)	22 – Ceasar	8 – Green	4 – Dibba	Mitchell Center (1,027); Mobile, AL
February 11, 2021; 6:00 pm, ESPN+		at Appalachian State	Canceled due to weather concerns.					Holmes Center; Boone, NC
February 13, 2021; 3:00 pm, ESPN+		Appalachian State	Canceled due to weather concerns.					HTC Center; Conway, SC
February 19, 2021; 6:00 pm, ESPN+		Georgia Southern	Canceled due to weather concerns.					HTC Center; Conway, SC
February 21, 2021; 1:00 pm, ESPN+		Georgia Southern	W 65–55	13–6 (7–5)	20 – Jones	11 – Jones	4 – Jones	HTC Center (147); Conway, SC
February 26, 2021; 7:00 pm, ESPN+		at Troy	W 75–59	14–6 (8–5)	23 – Mostafa	12 – Mostafa	4 – Dibba	Trojan Arena; Troy, AL
February 27, 2021; 5:00 pm, ESPN+		at Troy	W 76–71	15–6 (9–5)	23 – Jones	11 – Mostafa	7 – Dibba	Trojan Arena; Troy, AL
Sun Belt tournament
March 6, 2021; 8:30 pm, ESPN+	(E2)	vs. (E6) Troy; Quarterfinals	W 86–68	16–6	20 – Jones	8 – Dixon	6 – Dibba	Hartsell Arena; Pensacola, FL
March 7, 2021; 9:00 pm, ESPN+	(E2)	vs. (E4) Appalachian State; Semifinals	L 61–64 ^{OT}	16–7	16 – Jones	10 – Tied	6 – Dibba	Pensacola Bay Center; Pensacola, FL
CBI
March 22, 2021; 2:30 pm, FloSports		vs. Bryant; Quarterfinals	W 93–82	17–7	25 – Jones	16 – Mostafa	10 – Dibba	Ocean Center (75); Daytona Beach, FL
March 23, 2021; 5:30 pm, FloSports		vs. Stetson; Semifinals	W 77–72 ^{OT}	18–7	22 – Mostafa	12 – Mostafa	8 – Dibba	Ocean Center; Daytona Beach, FL
March 24, 2021; 6:00 pm, FloSports		vs. Pepperdine; Championship	L 61–84	18–8	16 – Tipler	6 – Harvey	4 – Dibba	Ocean Center (193); Daytona Beach, FL
*Non-conference game. ^{#}Rankings from AP Poll. (#) Tournament seedings in parentheses. All times are in Eastern.
