= 2020–21 Arkansas State Red Wolves men's basketball team =

American college basketball season

2020–21 Arkansas State Red Wolves men's basketball
- Conference: Sun Belt Conference
- West Division
- Record: 11–13 (7–8 Sun Belt)
- Head coach: Mike Balado (4th season)
- Assistant coaches: Rick Cabrera; Mike Scutero; Brent Crews
- Home arena: First National Bank Arena

2020–21 Sun Belt Conference men's basketball standings
	Conf.				Overall
Team	W		L	PCT	W		L	PCT
East
Georgia State	8	–	4	.667	16	–	6	.727
Coastal Carolina	9	–	5	.643	18	–	8	.692
South Alabama	10	–	7	.588	17	–	11	.607
Appalachian State †	7	–	8	.467	17	–	12	.586
Georgia Southern	7	–	9	.438	13	–	13	.500
Troy	4	–	12	.250	11	–	17	.393
West
Texas State	12	–	3	.800	18	–	7	.720
Louisiana	10	–	7	.588	17	–	9	.654
UT Arlington	9	–	8	.529	13	–	13	.500
Arkansas State	7	–	8	.467	11	–	13	.458
Little Rock	7	–	11	.389	11	–	15	.423
Louisiana–Monroe	5	–	13	.278	7	–	19	.269
† 2021 Sun Belt Tournament winner

The 2020–21 Arkansas State Red Wolves men's basketball team represented Arkansas State University during the 2020–21 NCAA Division I men's basketball season. The Red Wolves, led by fourth-year head coach Mike Balado, played their home games at the First National Bank Arena in Jonesboro, Arkansas as members of the Sun Belt Conference. With the creation of divisions to cut down on travel due to the COVID-19 pandemic, they played in the West Division.

== Previous season ==
The Red Wolves finished the 2019–20 season 16–16, 8–12 in Sun Belt play to finish in a three-way tie for eighth place. As the No. 9 seed in the Sun Belt tournament, they lost in the first round to Louisiana.

== Roster ==
2020–21 Arkansas State Red Wolves men's basketball team
Players
Coaches

Pos.	#	Name	Height	Weight	Year	Hometown
G	0	Caleb Fields	6 ft 0 in (1.83 m)	190 lb (86 kg)	So	Lewisburg, TN
F	1	Markise Davis	6 ft 8 in (2.03 m)	195 lb (88 kg)	Jr	Oxford, AL
G	2	Avery Felts	6 ft 2 in (1.88 m)	190 lb (86 kg)	RS Fr	Jonesboro, AR
F	3	Lazar Grbovic	6 ft 8 in (2.03 m)	230 lb (104 kg)	Fr	Belgrade, Serbia
G	5	Christian Willis	6 ft 2 in (1.88 m)	195 lb (88 kg)	RS Sr	Belleville, IL
G	10	Malcolm Farrington	6 ft 3 in (1.91 m)	205 lb (93 kg)	RS Fr	West Palm Beach, FL
F	12	Tim Holland Jr.	6 ft 8 in (2.03 m)	220 lb (100 kg)	RS Jr	Round Rock, TX
G	13	Mario Fantina	6 ft 4 in (1.93 m)	195 lb (88 kg)	Fr	Sveti Filip i Jakov, Croatia
F	15	Norchad Omier	6 ft 7 in (2.01 m)	230 lb (104 kg)	Fr	Bluefields, Nicaragua
F	21	Cheikh Ndour	6 ft 7 in (2.01 m)	225 lb (102 kg)	Fr	Médina Yoro Foulah, Senegal
F	22	Keyon Wesley	6 ft 9 in (2.06 m)	180 lb (82 kg)	Jr	Chesilhurst, NJ
G	23	Marquis Eaton	6 ft 2 in (1.88 m)	200 lb (91 kg)	Sr	Helena, AR
G	24	Caleb London	6 ft 4 in (1.93 m)	190 lb (86 kg)	Fr	Memphis, TN
F	50	Antwon Jackson	6 ft 7 in (2.01 m)	270 lb (122 kg)	So	Las Vegas, NV

Head coach

- Mike Balado (St. Thomas)

Assistant coach(es)

- Rick Cabrera (Tennessee Tech)
- Brent Crews (Florida Atlantic)
- Mike Scutero (UCF)

Legend

- (C) Team captain
- (S) Suspended
- (I) Ineligible
- (W) Walk-on
- Injured
- Current redshirt

Roster
Last update: November 26, 2020

== Schedule and results ==
Date time, TV	Rank^{#}	Opponent^{#}	Result	Record	High points	High rebounds	High assists	Site (attendance) city, state
Non-conference Regular season
November 25, 2020		vs. Jackson State; Justin Reed Ole Miss Classic	Canceled due to COVID-19 issues					The Pavilion at Ole Miss; Oxford, MS
November 26, 2020		vs. Central Arkansas; Justin Reed Ole Miss Classic	Canceled due to COVID-19 issues					The Pavilion at Ole Miss; Oxford, MS
November 27, 2020		at Ole Miss; Justin Reed Ole Miss Classic	Canceled due to COVID-19 issues					The Pavilion at Ole Miss; Oxford, MS
November 27, 2020*; 3:00 pm, CUSA.TV		at Marshall	L 56–70	0–1	13 – Eaton	8 – Holland Jr.	5 – Fields	Cam Henderson Center (1,251); Huntington, WV
November 29, 2020*; 3:00 pm, ESPN+		at Morehead State	L 61–69	0–2	22 – Fields	6 – Omier	4 – Eaton	Ellis Johnson Arena (100); Morehead, KY
December 2, 2020*; 7:00 pm, ESPN+		at Memphis	L 54–83	0–3	13 – Davis	5 – Fields	3 – Eaton	FedExForum (2,829); Memphis, TN
December 4, 2020*; 7:00 pm, ESPN+		Crowley's Ridge	W 115–49	1–3	21 – Omier	13 – Omier	6 – Eaton	First National Bank Arena (551); Jonesboro, AR
December 9, 2020*; 6:00 pm, ESPN+		Arkansas–Pine Bluff	L 74–75	1–4	21 – Omier	19 – Omier	4 – Fields	First National Bank Arena (695); Jonesboro, AR
December 11, 2020*; 7:30 pm, ESPN+		Central Baptist	W 81–69	2–4	16 – Omier	10 – Omier	3 – Omier	First National Bank Arena (541); Jonesboro, AR
December 16, 2020		at Stephen F. Austin	Canceled due to COVID-19 issues					William R. Johnson Coliseum; Nacogdoches, TX
December 18, 2020		Freed–Hardeman	Canceled due to COVID-19 issues					First National Bank Arena; Jonesboro, AR
December 20, 2020*; 2:00 pm, ESPN+		Champion Christian	W 90–50	3–4	14 – Omier	16 – Omier	3 – Fields	First National Bank Arena (270); Jonesboro, AR
Conference Regular season
January 1, 2021; 6:00 pm, ESPN+		at Louisiana–Monroe	L 72–84	3–5 (0–1)	22 – Davis	10 – Omier	4 – Eaton	Fant–Ewing Coliseum (621); Monroe, LA
January 2, 2021; 4:00 pm, ESPN+		at Louisiana–Monroe	L 55–62	3–6 (0–2)	16 – Fields	10 – Omier	2 – Fields	Fant–Ewing Coliseum (742); Monroe, LA
January 8, 2021; 6:00 pm, ESPN+		at Texas State	Postponed due to COVID-19 issues					Strahan Arena; San Marcos, TX
January 9, 2021; 4:00 pm, ESPN+		at Texas State	Postponed due to COVID-19 issues					Strahan Arena; San Marcos, TX
January 15, 2021; 6:00 pm, ESPN+		Louisiana–Monroe	W 74–72	4–6 (1–2)	19 – Fields	12 – Omier	6 – Fields	First National Bank Arena (955); Jonesboro, AR
January 16, 2021; 4:00 pm, ESPN+		Louisiana–Monroe	W 93–72	5–6 (2–2)	22 – Omier	17 – Omier	10 – Eaton	First National Bank Arena (1,074); Jonesboro, AR
January 22, 2021; 6:00 pm, ESPN+		at Louisiana	L 68–81	5–7 (2–3)	15 – Eaton	10 – Omier	4 – Fields	Cajundome (669); Lafayette, LA
January 23, 2021; 4:00 pm, ESPN+		at Louisiana	L 74–77	5–8 (2–4)	15 – Willis	13 – Omier	7 – Eaton	Cajundome (464); Lafayette, LA
January 29, 2021; 6:00 pm, ESPN+		UT Arlington	W 83–75 ^{OT}	6–8 (3–4)	18 – Eaton	20 – Omier	7 – Fields	First National Bank Arena (624); Jonesboro, AR
January 30, 2021; 4:00 pm, ESPN+		UT Arlington	L 64–65	6–9 (3–5)	14 – Omier	10 – Omier	7 – Eaton	First National Bank Arena (905); Jonesboro, AR
February 5, 2021; 6:00 pm, ESPN+		Louisiana	W 95–87	7–9 (4–5)	32 – Eaton	9 – Omier	9 – Eaton	First National Bank Arena (605); Jonesboro, AR
February 6, 2021; 4:00 pm, ESPN+		Louisiana	W 83–77	8–9 (5–5)	15 – Eaton	10 – Omier	10 – Eaton	First National Bank Arena (734); Jonesboro, AR
February 12, 2021; 7:30 pm, ESPN+		Little Rock	W 73–62	9–9 (6–5)	17 – Eaton	11 – Omier	8 – Eaton	First National Bank Arena (819); Jonesboro, AR
February 13, 2021; 4:00 pm, ESPN+		at Little Rock	W 67–65	10–9 (7–5)	16 – Eaton	7 – Jackson	5 – Eaton	Jack Stephens Center (1,021); Little Rock, AR
February 16, 2021; 6:00 pm, ESPN+		at Texas State rescheduled from January 8	Canceled due to weather concerns.					Strahan Arena; San Marcos, TX
February 19, 2021; 6:00 pm, ESPN+		Texas State rescheduled from January 9	Postponed due to weather concerns.					First National Bank Arena; Jonesboro, AR
February 22, 2021; 6:00 pm, ESPN+		Texas State rescheduled from February 19	L 52–57	10–10 (7–6)	16 – Omier	14 – Omier	2 – Fields	First National Bank Arena (834); Jonesboro, AR
February 26, 2021; 6:00 pm, ESPN+		at UT Arlington	L 71–73	10–11 (7–7)	20 – Eaton	14 – Omier	7 – Eaton	College Park Center (624); Arlington, TX
February 27, 2021; 4:00 pm, ESPN+		at UT Arlington	L 56–64	10–12 (7–8)	15 – Eaton	11 – Omier	8 – Eaton	College Park Center (624); Arlington, TX
Sun Belt tournament
March 5, 2021; 5:00 pm, ESPN+	(W4)	vs. (E5) Georgia Southern; First round	W 62–58	11–12	16 – Farrington	18 – Omier	4 – Eaton	Hartsell Arena (200); Pensacola, FL
March 6, 2021; 6:30 pm, ESPN+	(W4)	vs. (E1) Georgia State; Quarterfinals	L 68–71	11–13	16 – Tied	18 – Omier	8 – Eaton	Pensacola Bay Center; Pensacola, FL
*Non-conference game. ^{#}Rankings from AP Poll. (#) Tournament seedings in parentheses. All times are in Central Time. Source.
