= 2020–21 Texas State Bobcats men's basketball team =

American college basketball season

2020–21 Texas State Bobcats men's basketball

Sun Belt regular season champions Sun Belt West Division champions
- Conference: Sun Belt Conference
- West Division
- Record: 18–7 (12–3 Sun Belt)
- Head coach: Terrence Johnson (1st season)
- Assistant coaches: Bennie Seltzer; Robert Guster; Dylan Johnson
- Home arena: Strahan Arena

2020–21 Sun Belt Conference men's basketball standings
	Conf.				Overall
Team	W		L	PCT	W		L	PCT
East
Georgia State	8	–	4	.667	16	–	6	.727
Coastal Carolina	9	–	5	.643	18	–	8	.692
South Alabama	10	–	7	.588	17	–	11	.607
Appalachian State †	7	–	8	.467	17	–	12	.586
Georgia Southern	7	–	9	.438	13	–	13	.500
Troy	4	–	12	.250	11	–	17	.393
West
Texas State	12	–	3	.800	18	–	7	.720
Louisiana	10	–	7	.588	17	–	9	.654
UT Arlington	9	–	8	.529	13	–	13	.500
Arkansas State	7	–	8	.467	11	–	13	.458
Little Rock	7	–	11	.389	11	–	15	.423
Louisiana–Monroe	5	–	13	.278	7	–	19	.269
† 2021 Sun Belt Tournament winner

The 2020–21 Texas State Bobcats men's basketball team represented Texas State University in the 2020–21 NCAA Division I men's basketball season. The Bobcats, led by first-year interim head coach Terrence Johnson, played their home games at Strahan Arena in San Marcos, Texas as members of the Sun Belt Conference. With the creation of divisions to cut down on travel due to the COVID-19 pandemic, they played in the West Division.

== Previous season ==
The Bobcats finished the 2019–20 season 21–11, 13–7 in Sun Belt play to finish in a tie for second place. They defeated Appalachian State in the quarterfinals of the Sun Belt tournament and were set to face South Alabama in the semifinals until the tournament was cancelled amid the COVID-19 pandemic.

On September 22, 2020, head coach Danny Kaspar resigned amid allegations of racially insensitive language used at players. He finished at Texas State with a seven-year record of 119–109.

== Roster ==
2020–21 Texas State Bobcats men's basketball team
Players
Coaches

Pos.	#	Name	Height	Weight	Year	Hometown
G	0	Dylan Dawson	6 ft 3 in (1.91 m)	180 lb (82 kg)	RS Fr	Humble, Texas
F	1	Isiah Small	6 ft 8 in (2.03 m)	170 lb (77 kg)	Sr	Jersey City, New Jersey
G	2	Caleb Asberry	6 ft 3 in (1.91 m)	170 lb (77 kg)	Jr	Pflugerville, Texas
G	3	Darien Jenkins	6 ft 3 in (1.91 m)	190 lb (86 kg)	Jr	Deer Park, New York
G	4	Shelby Adams	6 ft 3 in (1.91 m)	175 lb (79 kg)	Sr	Converse, Texas
G	5	Marlin Davis	6 ft 2 in (1.88 m)	165 lb (75 kg)	RS Sr	Houston, Texas
G	10	Drew Tennial	6 ft 5 in (1.96 m)	210 lb (95 kg)	So	Edmond, Oklahoma
F	11	Nate Martin	6 ft 8 in (2.03 m)	215 lb (98 kg)	Fr	Cypress, Texas
G	12	Mason Harrell	5 ft 9 in (1.75 m)	145 lb (66 kg)	Jr	Midwest City, Oklahoma
F	13	Mason Hix	6 ft 8 in (2.03 m)	185 lb (84 kg)	Jr	Decatur, Texas
F	14	Quentin Scott	6 ft 7 in (2.01 m)	215 lb (98 kg)	Sr	Houma, Louisiana
G	15	Addison Wallace	6 ft 4 in (1.93 m)	200 lb (91 kg)	So	Cleburne, Texas
G	20	Deuce Guidry	5 ft 8 in (1.73 m)	155 lb (70 kg)	Fr	Dickinson, Texas
F	22	Nighael Ceaser	6 ft 8 in (2.03 m)	225 lb (102 kg)	Jr	Houston, Texas
F	25	Alonzo Sule	6 ft 7 in (2.01 m)	200 lb (91 kg)	Jr	Houston, Texas

Head coach

- Terrence Johnson (Southern)
  (Interim HC)

Assistant coach(es)

- Bennie Seltzer (Washington State)
- Robert Guster (Missouri–Rolla)
- Dylan Johnson (Michigan

Legend

- (C) Team captain
- (S) Suspended
- (I) Ineligible
- (W) Walk-on
- Injured
- Current redshirt

Roster
Last update: November 27, 2020

== Schedule and results ==
Date time, TV	Rank^{#}	Opponent^{#}	Result	Record	High points	High rebounds	High assists	Site (attendance) city, state
Non-conference regular season
November 25, 2020*; 6:00 pm, ESPN+		Mary Hardin–Baylor	W 98–59	1–0	17 – Small	8 – Small	5 – Harrell	Strahan Arena (653); San Marcos, TX
November 28, 2020*; 2:00 pm		at Texas A&M–Corpus Christi	W 75–63	2–0	18 – Harrell	9 – Small	3 – Small	American Bank Center (445); Corpus Christi, TX
November 30, 2020*; 7:00 pm, SECN		at Mississippi State	L 51–68	2–1	15 – Harrell	6 – Adams	6 – Davis	Humphrey Coliseum; Starkville, MS
December 5, 2020*; 2:00 pm, ESPN+		Incarnate Word	W 72–64	3–1	15 – Adams	10 – Small	7 – Davis	Strahan Arena (701); San Marcos, TX
December 9, 2020*; 7:00 pm, LHN		at No. 13 Texas	L 53–74	3–2	14 – Harrell	6 – Small	3 – Asberry	Frank Erwin Center (2,426); Austin, TX
December 12, 2020*; 4:00 pm, ESPN+		Our Lady of the Lake	L 58–61	3–3	13 – Harrell	11 – Small	5 – Harrell	Strahan Arena (674); San Marcos, TX
December 15, 2020*; 7:00 pm, ESPN+		Texas A&M–Corpus Christi	W 51–46	4–3	15 – Asberry	11 – Small	5 – Harrell	Strahan Arena (752); San Marcos, TX
December 19, 2020*; 2:00 pm		at Denver; The Pioneer Challenge	W 70–68	5–3	28 – Asberry	3 – Small	3 – Small	Hamilton Gymnasium (0); Denver, CO
December 21, 2020*; 2:00 pm		vs. Northern Arizona; The Pioneer Challenge	W 70–65	6–3	21 – Asberry	6 – Small	4 – Asberry	Hamilton Gymnasium (0); Denver, Co
Sun Belt Conference regular season
January 1, 2021; 6:00 pm, ESPN+		at Louisiana	L 77–83 ^{OT}	6–4 (0–1)	24 – Small	6 – Davis	11 – Davis	Cajundome (1,312); Lafayette, LA
January 2, 2021; 2:00 pm, ESPN+		at Louisiana	W 71–59	7–4 (1–1)	18 – Small	5 – Adams	7 – Davis	Cajundome (416); Lafayette, LA
January 8, 2021; 6:00 pm, ESPN+		Arkansas State	Postponed due to COVID-19 issues					Strahan Arena; San Marcos, TX
January 9, 2021; 4:00 pm, ESPN+		Arkansas State	Postponed due to COVID-19 issues					Strahan Arena; San Marcos, TX
January 15, 2021; 6:30 pm, ESPN+		at Little Rock	W 63–59	8–4 (2–1)	18 – Asberry	10 – Davis	5 – Davis	Jack Stephens Center (528); Little Rock, AR
January 16, 2021; 4:00 pm, ESPN+		at Little Rock	W 67–56	9–4 (3–1)	23 – Asberry	7 – Asberry	2 – Small	Jack Stephens Center (427); Little Rock, AR
January 22, 2021; 6:00 pm, ESPN+		at Louisiana–Monroe	W 57–47	10–4 (4–1)	15 – Small	8 – Asberry	3 – Davis	Fant–Ewing Coliseum (1,633); Monroe, LA
January 23, 2021; 4:00 pm, ESPN+		at Louisiana–Monroe	W 69–63	11–4 (5–1)	20 – Small	8 – Small	5 – Asberry	Fant–Ewing Coliseum (1,063); Monroe, LA
January 29, 2021; 6:00 pm, ESPN+		Louisiana	L 60–62	11–5 (5–2)	14 – Harrell	12 – Adams	3 – Davis	Strahan Arena (853); San Marcos, TX
January 30, 2021; 4:00 pm, ESPN+		Louisiana	L 73–74	11–6 (5–3)	27 – Harrell	7 – Adams	4 – Harrell	Strahan Arena (935); San Marcos, TX
February 5, 2021; 6:00 pm, ESPN+		Little Rock	W 57–47	12–6 (6–3)	10 – Sule	6 – Adams	5 – Davis	Strahan Arena (801); San Marcos, TX
February 6, 2021; 4:00 pm, ESPN+		Little Rock	W 77–67	13–6 (7–3)	21 – Asberry	6 – Asberry	4 – Small	Strahan Arena (758); San Marcos, TX
February 11, 2021; 6:00 pm, ESPN+		at UT Arlington	W 63–56	14–6 (8–3)	19 – Harrell	7 – Small	7 – Harrell	College Park Center (624); Arlington, TX
February 13, 2021; 2:00 pm, ESPN+		UT Arlington	W 79–68	15–6 (9–3)	21 – Small	10 – Small	3 – Harrell	Strahan Arena (737); San Marcos, TX
February 19, 2021; 6:00 pm, ESPN+		at Arkansas State rescheduled from January 8	Cancelled due to weather issues					First National Bank Arena; Jonesboro, AR
February 22, 2021; 6:00 pm, ESPN+		at Arkansas State rescheduled from January 9	W 57–52	16–6 (10–3)	17 – Harrell	6 – Small	2 – Harrell	First National Bank Arena (834); Jonesboro, AR
February 26, 2021; 4:00 pm, ESPN+		Louisiana–Monroe	W 58–49	17–6 (11–3)	17 – Small	7 – Small	2 – Harrell	Strahan Arena; San Marcos, TX
February 27, 2021; 4:00 pm, ESPN+		Louisiana–Monroe	W 61–57	18–6 (12–3)	19 – Asberry	7 – Asberry/Wallace	4 – Dawson	Strahan Arena; San Marcos, TX
Sun Belt tournament
March 6, 2021; 8:00 pm, ESPN+	(W1)	vs. (E4) Appalachian State; Quarterfinals	L 73–76 ^{OT}	18–7	20 – Harrell	10 – Asberry	3 – Small	Pensacola Bay Center; Pensacola, FL
*Non-conference game. ^{#}Rankings from AP Poll. (#) Tournament seedings in parentheses. All times are in Central.
