= 2020–21 UT Arlington Mavericks men's basketball team =

American college basketball season

2020–21 UT Arlington Mavericks men's basketball
- Conference: Sun Belt Conference
- West Division
- Record: 13–13 (9–8 Sun Belt)
- Head coach: Chris Ogden (3rd season)
- Associate head coach: Greg Young
- Assistant coaches: Riley Davis; Royce Johnson
- Home arena: College Park Center

2020–21 Sun Belt Conference men's basketball standings
	Conf.				Overall
Team	W		L	PCT	W		L	PCT
East
Georgia State	8	–	4	.667	16	–	6	.727
Coastal Carolina	9	–	5	.643	18	–	8	.692
South Alabama	10	–	7	.588	17	–	11	.607
Appalachian State †	7	–	8	.467	17	–	12	.586
Georgia Southern	7	–	9	.438	13	–	13	.500
Troy	4	–	12	.250	11	–	17	.393
West
Texas State	12	–	3	.800	18	–	7	.720
Louisiana	10	–	7	.588	17	–	9	.654
UT Arlington	9	–	8	.529	13	–	13	.500
Arkansas State	7	–	8	.467	11	–	13	.458
Little Rock	7	–	11	.389	11	–	15	.423
Louisiana–Monroe	5	–	13	.278	7	–	19	.269
† 2021 Sun Belt Tournament winner

The 2020–21 UT Arlington Mavericks men's basketball team represented the University of Texas at Arlington in the 2020–21 NCAA Division I men's basketball season. The Mavericks, led by third-year head coach Chris Ogden, played their home games at the College Park Center in Arlington, Texas as members of the Sun Belt Conference. With the creation of divisions to cut down on travel due to the COVID-19 pandemic, they played in the West Division.

== Previous season ==
The Mavericks finished the 2019–20 season 14–18, 10–10 in Sun Belt play to finish seventh place. They lost in the first round of the Sun Belt tournament to Coastal Carolina.

== Roster ==
2020–21 UT Arlington Mavericks men's basketball team
Players
Coaches

Pos.	#	Name	Height	Weight	Year	Hometown
F	0	Kaodirichi Akobundu-Ehiogu	6 ft 9 in (2.06 m)	190 lb (86 kg)	RS So	Mesquite, Texas
G	1	Sam Griffin	6 ft 3 in (1.91 m)	180 lb (82 kg)	So	Miami, Florida
F	2	Jordan Phillips	6 ft 7 in (2.01 m)	218 lb (99 kg)	Jr	Fort Worth, Texas
G	3	Carson Bischoff	6 ft 4 in (1.93 m)	210 lb (95 kg)	RS Jr	Ogden, Utah
G	4	David Azore	6 ft 4 in (1.93 m)	205 lb (93 kg)	RS Jr	Houston, Texas
G	5	Brandyn Talboy	6 ft 5 in (1.96 m)	170 lb (77 kg)	Fr	Newmarket, Ontario
F	10	Fredelin De La Cruz	6 ft 7 in (2.01 m)	220 lb (100 kg)	Jr	El Seibo, Dominican Republic
F	11	Lazaro Rojas	6 ft 11 in (2.11 m)	235 lb (107 kg)	RS Sr	Porto Seguro, Brazil
G	13	Shahada Wells	6 ft 0 in (1.83 m)	176 lb (80 kg)	Jr	Amarillo, Texas
G	14	Davis Steelman	6 ft 3 in (1.91 m)	185 lb (84 kg)	Sr	Bedford, Texas
G	15	Antonio Romanelli	6 ft 0 in (1.83 m)	170 lb (77 kg)	Fr	Sydney, Australia
G	20	Nicolas Elame	6 ft 3 in (1.91 m)	185 lb (84 kg)	So	Paris, France
F	21	Tre Jones	6 ft 5 in (1.96 m)	205 lb (93 kg)	RS Fr	Arlington, Texas
F	22	TiAndre Jackson-Young	6 ft 4 in (1.93 m)	200 lb (91 kg)	Sr	Marshall, Texas
F	23	Patrick Mwamba	6 ft 6 in (1.98 m)	196 lb (89 kg)	RS So	Bukavu, Democratic Republic of the Congo
G	33	McKade Marquis	6 ft 1 in (1.85 m)	195 lb (88 kg)	RS So	Whitehouse, Texas
F	35	Grayson Carter	6 ft 10 in (2.08 m)	225 lb (102 kg)	RS So	Dallas, Texas

Head coach

- Chris Ogden (Texas)

Assistant coach(es)

- Greg Young (Howard Payne)
- Riley Davis (Howard)
- Royce Johnson (Thomas Edison State)

Legend

- (C) Team captain
- (S) Suspended
- (I) Ineligible
- (W) Walk-on
- Injured
- Current redshirt

Roster
Last update: November 25, 2020

== Schedule and results ==
Date time, TV	Rank^{#}	Opponent^{#}	Result	Record	High points	High rebounds	High assists	Site (attendance) city, state
Non-conference regular season
November 25, 2020*; 3:00 pm, ESPN		Oklahoma State	L 68–75	0–1	21 – Wells	8 – Elame	5 – Elame	College Park Center (624); Arlington, TX
November 27, 2020*; 6:30 pm		at Louisiana Tech; Louisiana Tech Classic	L 71–76	0–2	18 – Azore	12 – Azore	6 – Elame	Thomas Assembly Center (1,200); Ruston, LA
November 28, 2020*; 3:00 pm		vs. Northwestern State; Louisiana Tech Classic	W 80–71	1–2	15 – Wells	12 – Mwamba	3 – Azore	Thomas Assembly Center (152); Ruston, LA
December 2, 2020*; 8:00 pm, SECN		at RV Arkansas	L 60–72	1–3	17 – Wells	6 – De La Cruz	3 – Wells	Bud Walton Arena (4,400); Fayetteville, AR
December 4, 2020*; 4:00 pm		at Tulsa	L 64–79	1–4	13 – Griffin	4 – Azore	3 – Wells	Reynolds Center; Tulsa, OK
December 11, 2020*; 6:00 pm, ESPN+		Hardin–Simmons	W 91–66	2–4	15 – De La Cruz	15 – De La Cruz	4 – De La Cruz	College Park Center (624); Arlington, TX
December 17, 2020*; 6:00 pm		Dallas Christian	W 109–48	3–4	15 – Azore	10 – De La Cruz	9 – Griffin	College Park Center (624); Arlington, TX
December 19, 2020*		at Oral Roberts	Cancelled due to COVID-19 restrictions					Mabee Center; Tulsa, OK
December 22, 2020*; 6:00 pm, ESPN+		Howard Payne	W 117–53	4–4	16 – Wells	9 – Elame	6 – Azore	College Park Center (624); Arlington, TX
Sun Belt Conference regular season
January 1, 2021; 4:00 pm, ESPN+		at Little Rock	L 93–102	4–5 (0–1)	25 – Griffin	5 – Steelman	5 – Wells	Jack Stephens Center (427); Little Rock, AR
January 2, 2021; 4:00 pm, ESPN+		at Little Rock	L 62–75	4–6 (0–2)	22 – Wells	7 – Wells	3 – Griffin	Jack Stephens Center (464); Little Rock, AR
January 8, 2021; 6:00 pm, ESPN+		at Louisiana–Monroe	W 77–64	5–6 (1–2)	25 – Wells	8 – Mwamba	8 – Griffin	Fant–Ewing Coliseum (988); Monroe, LA
January 9, 2021; 4:00 pm, ESPN+		at Louisiana–Monroe	W 75–74	6–6 (2–2)	18 – Griffin	8 – Carter	7 – Wells	Fant–Ewing Coliseum (903); Monroe, LA
January 15, 2021; 6:00 pm, ESPN+		Louisiana	W 91–86	7–6 (3–2)	31 – Wells	8 – Wells	5 – Wells	College Park Center (624); Arlington, TX
January 16, 2021; 4:00 pm, ESPN+		Louisiana	L 51–68	7–7 (3–3)	10 – De La Cruz	10 – De La Cruz	4 – Wells	College Park Center (624); Arlington, TX
January 22, 2021; 6:00 pm, ESPN+		Little Rock	L 59–66	7–8 (3–4)	14 – Wells	14 – Akobundu-Ehiogu	5 – Wells	College Park Center (624); Arlington, TX
January 23, 2021; 4:00 pm, ESPN+		Little Rock	W 66–61	8–8 (4–4)	17 – Griffin	10 – Phillips	5 – Wells	College Park Center (624); Arlington, TX
January 29, 2021; 6:00 pm, ESPN+		at Arkansas State	L 75–83 ^{OT}	8–9 (4–5)	28 – Griffin	9 – Akobundu-Ehiogu	3 – Griffin	First National Bank Arena (624); Jonesboro, AR
January 30, 2021; 4:00 pm, ESPN+		at Arkansas State	W 65–64	9–9 (5–5)	23 – Griffin	9 – Elame	3 – Phillips	First National Bank Arena (905); Jonesboro, AR
February 5, 2021; 6:00 pm, ESPN+		Louisiana–Monroe	W 63–56	10–9 (6–5)	23 – Griffin	10 – Akobundu-Ehiogu	7 – Wells	College Park Center (624); Arlington, TX
February 6, 2021; 4:00 pm, ESPN+		Louisiana–Monroe	W 58–52	11–9 (7–5)	19 – Mwamba	12 – Mwamba	3 – Griffin	College Park Center (624); Arlington, TX
February 11, 2021; 6:00 pm, ESPN+		Texas State	L 56–63	11–10 (7–6)	20 – Wells	6 – Akobundu-Ehiogu	4 – Wells	College Park Center (624); Arlington, TX
February 13, 2021; 4:00 pm, ESPN+		at Texas State	L 68–79	11–11 (7–7)	17 – Wells	5 – Akobundu-Ehiogu	5 – Wells	Strahan Arena (737); San Marcos, TX
February 19, 2021; 6:00 pm, ESPN+		at Louisiana	Cancelled due to weather concerns.					Cajundome; Lafayette, LA
February 22, 2021; 5:00 pm, ESPN+		at Louisiana	L 74–76	11–12 (7–8)	19 – Wells	10 – Akobundu-Ehiogu	4 – Wells	Cajundome (389); Lafayette, LA
February 26, 2021; 6:00 pm, ESPN+		Arkansas State	W 73–71	12–12 (8–8)	22 – Azore	4 – Akobundu-Ehiogu	7 – Wells	College Park Center (624); Arlington, TX
February 27, 2021; 4:00 pm, ESPN+		Arkansas State	W 64–56	13–12 (9–8)	13 – Mwamba	9 – Azore	9 – Wells	College Park Center (624); Arlington, TX
Sun Belt tournament
March 5, 2021; 8:00 pm, ESPN+	(W3)	vs. (E6) Troy; First round	L 86–91	13–13	21 – Azore	8 – Mwamba	3 – Wells	Pensacola Bay Center; Pensacola, FL
*Non-conference game. ^{#}Rankings from AP Poll. (#) Tournament seedings in parentheses. All times are in Central.
