= Dustin Kerns =

American basketball coach (born 1980)

Current position
- Title: Head coach
- Team: Appalachian State
- Conference: Sun Belt
- Record: 136–92 (.596)

Biographical details
- Born: February 1, 1980 (age 46); Kingsport, Tennessee, U.S.
- Education: Clemson ('02)

Coaching career (HC unless noted)
- 2003–2004: Tennessee (GA)
- 2004–2007: Wofford (asst.)
- 2007–2013: Santa Clara (asst.)
- 2013–2017: Wofford (Assoc. HC)
- 2017–2019: Presbyterian
- 2019–present: Appalachian State

Administrative career (AD unless noted)
- 2002–2003: Tennessee Tech (DBO)

Head coaching record
- Overall: 167–129 (.564)
- Tournaments: 0–1 (NCAA); 0–1 (NIT); 0–1 (TBC); 2–1 (CIT)

Accomplishments and honors

Championships
- Sun Belt tournament (2021); Sun Belt regular season (2024)

Awards
- Sun Belt Coach of the Year (2024)

Dustin Kerns (born February 1, 1980) is an American college basketball coach, and current head coach of the Appalachian State Mountaineers men's basketball team.

== Coaching career ==
Kerns served as a student assistant at Clemson for its men's basketball team, and after graduation landed his first coaching job at Tennessee Tech. Following a one-year stop as a graduate assistant at Tennessee, Kerns joined Mike Young's staff at Wofford from 2004 to 2007, then moved on to Santa Clara as an assistant from 2007 to 2013. He returned to Wofford as the associate head coach in 2013, where he was on staff for the Terriers' 2014 and 2015 NCAA Tournament appearances.

On May 23, 2017, Kerns was named the head coach at Presbyterian. Kerns took over a Presbyterian program that had endured 12 straight losing seasons and a 5 win campaign the previous season. The program quickly turned around as in his 2nd season at Presbyterian, he led the Blue Hose to a 20 win season, first ever post-season berth, and quarterfinal appearance in the CIT Tournament. Kerns was named a Finalist for the Jim Phelan National Coach of the Year and the Hugh Durham Mid-Major National Coach of the Year. After two seasons and a 31–37 record, including a nine–win turnaround in season two with the Blue Hose, Kerns was named the head coach at Appalachian State on March 28, 2019.

== Head coaching record ==
=== NCAA DI ===
Record table
Season	Team	Overall	Conference	Standing	Postseason
Presbyterian Blue Hose (Big South) (2017–2019)
2017–18	Presbyterian	11–21	4–14	9th	
2018–19	Presbyterian	20–16	9–7	T–5th	CIT Quarterfinals
Presbyterian:		31–37 (.456)	13–21 (.382)		
Appalachian State Mountaineers (Sun Belt) (2019–present)
2019–20	Appalachian State	18–15	11–9	6th	
2020–21	Appalachian State	17–12	7–8	4th (East)	NCAA Division I First Four
2021–22	Appalachian State	19–15	12–6	2nd	TBC First Round
2022–23	Appalachian State	16–16	9–9	T–7th	
2023–24	Appalachian State	27–7	16–2	1st	NIT First Round
2024–25	Appalachian State	17–13	10–8	6th	
2025–26	Appalachian State	19–13	11–7	T–2nd	
2026–27	Appalachian State	3–1	0–0		
Appalachian State:		136–92 (.596)	76–49 (.608)		
Total:		167–129 (.564)			
National champion Postseason invitational champion Conference regular season champion Conference regular season and conference tournament champion Division regular season champion Division regular season and conference tournament champion Conference tournament champion
