= 2020–21 Louisiana Ragin' Cajuns men's basketball team =

American college basketball season

2020–21 Louisiana Ragin' Cajuns men's basketball
- Conference: Sun Belt Conference
- West Division
- Record: 17–9 (10–7 Sun Belt)
- Head coach: Bob Marlin (11th season)
- Assistant coaches: Neil Hardin; Brock Morris; Josten Crow
- Home arena: Cajundome

2020–21 Sun Belt Conference men's basketball standings
	Conf.				Overall
Team	W		L	PCT	W		L	PCT
East
Georgia State	8	–	4	.667	16	–	6	.727
Coastal Carolina	9	–	5	.643	18	–	8	.692
South Alabama	10	–	7	.588	17	–	11	.607
Appalachian State †	7	–	8	.467	17	–	12	.586
Georgia Southern	7	–	9	.438	13	–	13	.500
Troy	4	–	12	.250	11	–	17	.393
West
Texas State	12	–	3	.800	18	–	7	.720
Louisiana	10	–	7	.588	17	–	9	.654
UT Arlington	9	–	8	.529	13	–	13	.500
Arkansas State	7	–	8	.467	11	–	13	.458
Little Rock	7	–	11	.389	11	–	15	.423
Louisiana–Monroe	5	–	13	.278	7	–	19	.269
† 2021 Sun Belt Tournament winner

The 2020–21 Louisiana Ragin' Cajuns men's basketball team represented the University of Louisiana at Lafayette during the 2020–21 NCAA Division I men's basketball season. The Ragin' Cajuns, led by eleventh-year head coach Bob Marlin, played their home games at the Cajundome as members of the Sun Belt Conference. With the creation of divisions to cut down on travel due to the COVID-19 pandemic, they played in the West Division.

== Previous season ==
The Ragin' Cajuns finished the 2019–20 season 14–19, 8–12 in Sun Belt play to finish eighth in the conference. The Cajuns proceeded to the Sun Belt Conference Men's Basketball Tournament. They ultimately lost to the Georgia Southern Eagles in heartbreaking fashion by the score of 81–82 in the second round. Shortly after their elimination, all sporting events as well as the finale of the tournament was cancelled due to the COVID-19 pandemic.

== Offseason ==
=== Departures ===
Name	Number	Pos.	Height	Weight	Year	Hometown	Notes
Jalen Johnson	1	F	6'7"	205	Junior	Baton Rouge, Louisiana	Transfer to Mississippi State
Javonne Lowery	5	G	6'3"	175	Freshman	Pearland, Texas	Released/Quit
Tirus Smith	11	F	6'8"	230	Junior	Richton, Mississippi	Released/Quit
P. J. Hardy	15	G	6'1"	170	Senior	Lake Charles, Louisiana	Graduated
Calvin Temple	22	G	6'0"	170	Freshman	Memphis, Tennessee	Released/Quit
Mason Aucoin	31	G	6'4"	205	Senior	Luling, Louisiana	Graduated
Kristian Lafayette	35	F	6'10"	200	Sophomore	Detroit, Michigan	Released/Quit
Jaylon Williams	55	G	6'2"	185	Freshman	Franklin, Louisiana	Released/Quit

=== Transfers ===
Name	Number	Pos.	Height	Weight	Year	Hometown	Old School
Devin Butts	1	G	6'6"	180	Sophomore	Macon, Georgia	Mississippi State
Jacobi Gordon	5	F	6'7"	220	Junior	Houston, Texas	California
Brayan Au	41	G	6'4"	190	Junior	Nuevo Casas Grande, Mexico	Ranger College
Theo Akwuba	-	F	6'11"	225	Junior	Montgomery, Alabama	Portland

=== Recruiting ===
College recruiting information
Name	Hometown	School	Height	Weight	Commit date
Michael Thomas; Guard	Lake Charles, LA	Hamilton Christian	6 ft 1 in (1.85 m)	160 lb (73 kg)	Nov 18, 2019
Michael Thomas; Guard	Recruit ratings: No ratings found				
Kentrell Garnett; Forward	Donaldsonville, LA	Catholic HS	6 ft 1 in (1.85 m)	165 lb (75 kg)	
Kentrell Garnett; Forward	Recruit ratings: No ratings found				
Isaiah Richards; Forward	Brooklyn, NY	South Shore HS; Commonwealth Academy	6 ft 10 in (2.08 m)	225 lb (102 kg)	May 15, 2020
Isaiah Richards; Forward	Recruit ratings: No ratings found				
Overall recruit ranking:
Note: In many cases, Scout, Rivals, 247Sports, On3, and ESPN may conflict in their listings of height and weight.; In these cases, the average was taken. ESPN grades are on a 100-point scale.; Sources: "Louisiana 2020-21 Basketball Commits". ESPN.; "2020-21 Team Ranking". Rivals.

== Roster ==
2020–21 Louisiana Ragin' Cajuns men's basketball team
Players
Coaches

Pos.	#	Name	Height	Weight	Year	Hometown
F	0	Cedric Russell	6 ft 2 in (1.88 m)	190 lb (86 kg)	Sr	Alexandria, Louisiana
G	1	Devin Butts	6 ft 6 in (1.98 m)	180 lb (82 kg)	RS So	Macon, Georgia
G	2	Michael Thomas	6 ft 1 in (1.85 m)	160 lb (73 kg)	Fr	Lake Charles, Louisiana
G	3	Trajan Wesley	5 ft 9 in (1.75 m)	165 lb (75 kg)	Jr	Navasota, Texas
F	4	Kobe Julien	6 ft 6 in (1.98 m)	215 lb (98 kg)	RS Fr	Baton Rouge, Louisiana
F	5	Jacobi Gordon	6 ft 7 in (2.01 m)	220 lb (100 kg)	Jr	Houston, Texas
F	10	Theo Akwuba	6 ft 11 in (2.11 m)	225 lb (102 kg)	Jr	Montgomery, Alabama
G	11	Durey Cadwell	6 ft 5 in (1.96 m)	185 lb (84 kg)	RS So	Houston, Texas
G	13	Mylik Wilson	6 ft 3 in (1.91 m)	175 lb (79 kg)	So	Rayville, Louisiana
G	22	Kentrell Garnett	6 ft 1 in (1.85 m)	165 lb (75 kg)	Fr	Donaldsonville, Louisiana
F	23	Dou Gueye	6 ft 9 in (2.06 m)	220 lb (100 kg)	Sr	Dakar, Senegal
F	25	Chris Spenkuch	6 ft 7 in (2.01 m)	195 lb (88 kg)	RS So	Pembroke Pines, Florida
F	35	Isaiah Richards	6 ft 10 in (2.08 m)	225 lb (102 kg)	Fr	Brooklyn, New York
G	41	Brayan Au	6 ft 4 in (1.93 m)	190 lb (86 kg)	Jr	Nuevo Casas Grandes, Mexico
G	55	Ty Harper	6 ft 3 in (1.91 m)	175 lb (79 kg)	Fr	Norcross, Georgia

Head coach

- Bob Marlin (Mississippi State)

Assistant coach(es)

- Neil Hardin (West Florida)
- Brock Morris (Alabama)
- Josten Crow (Sam Houston State)

Legend

- (C) Team captain
- (S) Suspended
- (I) Ineligible
- (W) Walk-on
- Injured
- Current redshirt

Roster
Last update: March 27, 2021

== Schedule and results ==
Date time, TV	Rank^{#}	Opponent^{#}	Result	Record	High points	High rebounds	High assists	Site (attendance) city, state
Non-conference Regular season
11/28/2020*; 7:00 p.m., FloHoops		No. 2 Baylor; Men's Vegas Bubble	L 82–112	0–1	26 – Russell	8 – Akwuba	3 – Gueye	T-Mobile Arena; Paradise, NV
12/02/2020*; 7:00 p.m.		at New Orleans	W 66–63	1–1	21 – Wilson	15 – Akwuba	6 – Au	Lakefront Arena (500); New Orleans, LA
12/05/2020*; 4:00 p.m., ESPN+		LSU–Shreveport	W 84–73	2–1	17 – Tied	11 – Tied	7 – Wilson	Cajundome (272); Lafayette, LA
12/08/2020*; 6:00 p.m., ESPN+		LSU–Alexandria	W 90–75	3–1	19 – Russell	17 – Gueye	6 – Wilson	Cajundome (349); Lafayette, LA
12/12/2020*; 7:00 p.m., ESPN+		Louisiana Tech	W 61–56	4–1	25 – Russell	10 – Akwuba	2 – Butts	Cajundome (1,459); Lafayette, LA
12/15/2020*; 6:00 p.m., ESPN+		New Orleans	W 73–63	5–1	20 – Russell	14 – Akwuba	7 – Au	Cajundome (366); Lafayette, LA
12/18/2020*; 6:00 p.m., ESPN+		at VCU	Cancelled due to NCAA scheduling limitations.					Siegel Center; Richmond, VA
12/19/2020*; 7:00 p.m., ESPN+		McNeese State	W 75–65	6–1	23 – Russell	13 – Gueye	7 – Au	Cajundome (314); Lafayette, LA
Conference Regular season
01/01/2021; 6:00 p.m., ESPN+		Texas State	W 83–77 ^{OT}	7–1 (1–0)	22 – Butts	11 – Wilson	4 – Au	Cajundome (1,312); Lafayette, LA
01/02/2021; 4:00 p.m., ESPN+		Texas State	L 59–71	7–2 (1–1)	14 – Wilson	9 – Akwuba	3 – Wilson	Cajundome (416); Lafayette, LA
01/08/2021; 6:00 p.m., ESPN+		Little Rock	W 66–64	8–2 (2–1)	12 – Tied	13 – Akwuba	4 – Au	Cajundome (457); Lafayette, LA
01/09/2021; 4:00 p.m., ESPN+		Little Rock	L 76–78 ^{OT}	8–3 (2–2)	17 – Tied	10 – Akwuba	3 – 3 tied	Cajundome (405); Lafayette, LA
01/15/2021; 6:00 p.m., ESPN+		at UT Arlington	L 86–91	8–4 (2–3)	17 – Russell	10 – Akwuba	6 – Au	College Park Center (624); Arlington, TX
01/16/2021; 4:00 p.m., ESPN+		at UT Arlington	W 68–51	9–4 (3–3)	25 – Wilson	16 – Wilson	3 – 3 tied	College Park Center (624); Arlington, TX
01/22/2021; 6:00 p.m., ESPN+		Arkansas State	W 81–68	10–4 (4–3)	26 – Russell	10 – Akwuba	4 – Au	Cajundome (669); Lafayette, LA
01/23/2021; 6:00 p.m., ESPN+		Arkansas State	W 77–74	11–4 (5–3)	14 – Tied	9 – Akwuba	6 – Au	Cajundome (464); Lafayette, LA
01/29/2021; 6:00 p.m., ESPN+		at Texas State	W 62–60	12–4 (6–3)	21 – Russell	10 – Gueye	2 – 3 tied	Strahan Arena (853); San Marcos, TX
01/30/2021; 4:00 p.m., ESPN+		at Texas State	W 74–73	13–4 (7–3)	24 – Russell	5 – Au	6 – Au	Strahan Arena (935); San Marcos, TX
02/05/2021; 6:00 p.m., ESPN+		at Arkansas State	L 87–95	13–5 (7–4)	23 – Gueye	14 – Gueye	4 – Au	First National Bank Arena (605); Jonesboro, AR
02/06/2021; 4:00 p.m., ESPN+		at Arkansas State	L 77–83	13–6 (7–5)	30 – Russell	8 – Gueye	2 – Butts	First National Bank Arena (734); Jonesboro, AR
02/11/2021; 7:00 p.m., ESPN+		Louisiana–Monroe	L 66–72	13–7 (7–6)	13 – Russell	12 – Akwuba	3 – Wilson	Cajundome (452); Lafayette, LA
02/13/2021; 4:00 p.m., ESPN+		at Louisiana–Monroe	W 88–72	14–7 (8–6)	20 – Wilson	7 – Akwuba	7 – Wilson	Fant–Ewing Coliseum (1,750); Monroe, LA
02/19/2021; 6:00 p.m., ESPN+		UT Arlington	Cancelled due to weather concerns.					Cajundome; Lafayette, LA
02/22/2021; 5:00 p.m., ESPN+		UT Arlington	W 76–74	15–7 (9–6)	26 – Russell	8 – Wilson	5 – Wilson	Cajundome (389); Lafayette, LA
02/26/2021; 6:30 p.m., ESPN+		at Little Rock	W 66–61	16–7 (10–6)	13 – Akwuba	9 – Gueye	4 – Gueye	Jack Stephens Center (410); Little Rock, AR
02/27/2021; 4:00 p.m., ESPN+		at Little Rock	L 59–69	16–8 (10–7)	13 – Russell	16 – Akwuba	4 – Wilson	Jack Stephens Center; Little Rock, AR
Sun Belt tournament
03/06/2021; 5:00 pm, ESPN+	(W2)	vs. (E3) South Alabama; Quarterfinals	W 79–68	17–8	19 – Akwuba	14 – Akwuba	6 – Wilson	Hartsell Arena; Pensacola, FL
03/07/2021; 5:30 pm, ESPN+	(W2)	vs. (E1) Georgia State; Semifinals	L 73–84	17–9	20 – Russell	9 – Gueye	6 – Wilson	Pensacola Bay Center; Pensacola, FL
*Non-conference game. ^{#}Rankings from AP Poll. (#) Tournament seedings in parentheses. All times are in Central Time.

== See also ==
- 2020–21 Louisiana Ragin' Cajuns women's basketball team
