= 2020–21 Louisiana–Monroe Warhawks men's basketball team =

American college basketball season

2020–21 Louisiana–Monroe Warhawks men's basketball
- Conference: Sun Belt Conference
- West Division
- Record: 7–19 (5–13 Sun Belt)
- Head coach: Keith Richard (11th season)
- Assistant coaches: Morris Scott; Isaac Fontenot-Amedee; Ronnie Dean
- Home arena: Fant–Ewing Coliseum

2020–21 Sun Belt Conference men's basketball standings
	Conf.				Overall
Team	W		L	PCT	W		L	PCT
East
Georgia State	8	–	4	.667	16	–	6	.727
Coastal Carolina	9	–	5	.643	18	–	8	.692
South Alabama	10	–	7	.588	17	–	11	.607
Appalachian State †	7	–	8	.467	17	–	12	.586
Georgia Southern	7	–	9	.438	13	–	13	.500
Troy	4	–	12	.250	11	–	17	.393
West
Texas State	12	–	3	.800	18	–	7	.720
Louisiana	10	–	7	.588	17	–	9	.654
UT Arlington	9	–	8	.529	13	–	13	.500
Arkansas State	7	–	8	.467	11	–	13	.458
Little Rock	7	–	11	.389	11	–	15	.423
Louisiana–Monroe	5	–	13	.278	7	–	19	.269
† 2021 Sun Belt Tournament winner

The 2020–21 Louisiana–Monroe Warhawks men's basketball team represented the University of Louisiana at Monroe in the 2020–21 NCAA Division I men's basketball season. The Warhawks, led by 11th-year head coach Keith Richard, played their home games at Fant–Ewing Coliseum in Monroe, Louisiana as members of the Sun Belt Conference. With the creation of divisions to cut down on travel due to the COVID-19 pandemic, they played in the West Division.

== Previous season ==
The Warhawks finished the 2019–20 season 9–20, 5–15 in Sun Belt play to finish in a tie for 11th place. They failed to qualify for the Sun Belt tournament.

== Roster ==
2020–21 Louisiana–Monroe Warhawks men's basketball team
Players
Coaches

Pos.	#	Name	Height	Weight	Year	Hometown
C	0	Chris Efretuei	7 ft 1 in (2.16 m)	260 lb (118 kg)	Sr	Abuja, Nigeria
G	1	Erie Olonade	5 ft 11 in (1.8 m)	180 lb (82 kg)	Sr	Houston, Texas
G	2	Koreem Ozier	6 ft 1 in (1.85 m)	180 lb (82 kg)	Jr	Racine, Wisconsin
G	3	Elijah Gonzales	5 ft 11 in (1.8 m)	160 lb (73 kg)	Jr	Clackamas, Oregon
G	4	Zaakir Sawyer	6 ft 5 in (1.96 m)	215 lb (98 kg)	Fr	Dallas, Texas
G	5	Marco Morency	6 ft 3 in (1.91 m)	185 lb (84 kg)	Jr	Mount Vernon, New York
G	10	Langston Powell	6 ft 5 in (1.96 m)	195 lb (88 kg)	Jr	West Monroe, Louisiana
G	11	Zion Simmons	6 ft 0 in (1.83 m)	180 lb (82 kg)	So	Monroe, Louisiana
F	13	Thomas Howell	6 ft 8 in (2.03 m)	225 lb (102 kg)	Fr	Natchitoches, Louisiana
G/F	14	D'Marcus Hall	6 ft 5 in (1.96 m)	205 lb (93 kg)	Fr	Haughton, Louisiana
G	15	Josh Nicholas	6 ft 3 in (1.91 m)	190 lb (86 kg)	Sr	Long Beach, New York
F	21	Luke Phillips	6 ft 10 in (2.08 m)	220 lb (100 kg)	RS So	Adelaide, Australia
G/F	22	Justin Gibson	6 ft 4 in (1.93 m)	195 lb (88 kg)	Jr	Gonzales, Louisiana
G	23	Johnnie Williams IV	6 ft 5 in (1.96 m)	180 lb (82 kg)	Fr	Sarasota, Florida
G/F	24	Russell Harrison	6 ft 7 in (2.01 m)	200 lb (91 kg)	Jr	Lubbock, Texas

Head coach

- Keith Richard (Northeast Louisiana)

Assistant coach(es)

- Morris Scott (Florida A&M)
- Isaac Fontenot-Amedee (Nicholls)
- Ronnie Dean (Harris–Stowe State)

Legend

- (C) Team captain
- (S) Suspended
- (I) Ineligible
- (W) Walk-on
- Injured
- Current redshirt

Roster
Last update: November 27, 2020

== Schedule and results ==
Date time, TV	Rank^{#}	Opponent^{#}	Result	Record	High points	High rebounds	High assists	Site (attendance) city, state
Non-conference Regular season
December 3, 2020*; 6:30 pm, CUSA.TV		at Louisiana Tech	L 62–78	0–1	15 – Harrison	7 – Harrison	4 – Morency	Thomas Assembly Center (1,200); Ruston, LA
December 6, 2020*; 2:00 pm		at Northwestern State	W 92–83 ^{OT}	1–1	16 – Ozier	9 – Ozier	5 – Ozier	Prather Coliseum (825); Natchitoches, LA
December 9, 2020*; 6:00 pm, ESPN+		Lamar	L 60–63	1–2	22 – Harrison	9 – Harrison	5 – Gonzales	Fant–Ewing Coliseum (1,016); Monroe, LA
November 12, 2020*; 4:00 pm, ESPN+		Stephen F. Austin	W 66–55	2–2	28 – Ozier	9 – Harrison	7 – Gonzales	Fant–Ewing Coliseum (638); Monroe, LA
December 16, 2020*; 6:00 pm, ESPN+		Grambling State	L 61–78	2–3	13 – Harrison	7 – Howell	4 – Gonzales	Fant–Ewing Coliseum (1,022); Monroe, LA
December 19, 2020*; 2:00 pm, ESPN+		at Southern Miss	L 47–60	2–4	9 – Harrison	6 – Efretuei	3 – Nicholas	Reed Green Coliseum (0); Hattiesburg, MS
December 22, 2020*; 6:30 pm, ESPN+		Louisiana Tech	L 57–68	2–5	12 – Efrentuei	7 – Ozier	4 – Gonzales	Fant–Ewing Coliseum (1,122); Monroe, LA
Conference Regular season
January 1, 2021; 6:00 pm, ESPN+		Arkansas State	W 84–72	3–5 (1–0)	17 – Ozier	5 – Phillips	4 – Nicholas	Fant–Ewing Coliseum (621); Monroe, LA
January 2, 2021; 4:00 pm, ESPN+		Arkansas State	W 62–55	4–5 (2–0)	13 – Ozier	8 – Ozier	4 – Harrison	Fant–Ewing Coliseum (742); Monroe, LA
January 8, 2021; 6:00 pm, ESPN+		UT Arlington	L 64–77	4–6 (2–1)	23 – Nicholas	5 – Harrison	8 – Ozier	Fant–Ewing Coliseum (988); Monroe, LA
January 9, 2021; 4:00 pm, ESPN+		UT Arlington	L 74–75	4–7 (2–2)	19 – Nicholas	5 – Ozier	5 – Ozier	Fant–Ewing Coliseum (903); Monroe, LA
January 15, 2021; 6:00 pm, ESPN+		at Arkansas State	L 72–74	4–8 (2–3)	22 – Ozier	8 – Harrison	6 – Nicholas	First National Bank Arena (955); Jonesboro, AR
January 16, 2021; 4:00 pm, ESPN+		at Arkansas State	L 72–93	4–9 (2–4)	18 – Ozier	8 – Harrison	4 – Gonzales	First National Bank Arena (1,074); Jonesboro, AR
January 22, 2021; 6:00 pm, ESPN+		Texas State	L 47–57	4–10 (2–5)	18 – Morency	6 – Morency	3 – Ozier	Fant–Ewing Coliseum (1,633); Monroe, LA
January 23, 2021; 4:00 pm, ESPN+		Texas State	L 63–69	4–11 (2–6)	21 – Harrison	7 – Morency	4 – Morency	Fant–Ewing Coliseum (1,063); Monroe, LA
January 29, 2021; 6:30 pm, ESPN+		at Little Rock	L 62–66	4–12 (2–7)	19 – Ozier	6 – Phillips	5 – Gonzales	Jack Stephens Center (547); Little Rock, AR
January 30, 2021; 4:00 pm, ESPN+		at Little Rock	L 49–65	4–13 (2–8)	13 – Nicholas	7 – Phillips	4 – Ozier	Jack Stephens Center (592); Little Rock, AR
February 5, 2021; 7:00 pm, ESPN+		at UT Arlington	L 56–63	4–14 (2–9)	15 – Nicholas	7 – Efretuei	7 – Morency	College Park Center (624); Arlington, TX
February 6, 2021; 2:00 pm, ESPN+		at UT Arlington	L 52–58	4–15 (2–10)	12 – Harrison	10 – Harrison	4 – Ozier	College Park Center (624); Arlington, TX
February 11, 2021; 7:00 pm, ESPN+		at Louisiana	W 72–66	5–15 (3–10)	17 – Harrison	10 – Harrison	5 – Gonzales	Cajundome (452); Lafayette, LA
February 13, 2021; 4:00 pm, ESPN+		Louisiana	L 72–88	5–16 (3–11)	17 – Harrison	3 – Ozier	5 – Gonzales	Fant–Ewing Coliseum (1,750); Monroe, LA
February 21, 2021; 4:00 pm, ESPN+		Little Rock	W 78–66	6–16 (4–11)	14 – Ozier	11 – Harrison	5 – Gonzales	Fant–Ewing Coliseum (1,311); Monroe, LA
February 22, 2021; 4:00 pm, ESPN+		Little Rock	W 68–64	7–16 (5–11)	18 – Morency	6 – Gonzales	7 – Gonzales	Fant–Ewing Coliseum (1,179); Monroe, LA
February 26, 2021; 6:00 pm, ESPN+		at Texas State	L 49–58	7–17 (5–12)	13 – Morency	7 – Harrison	3 – Morency	Strahan Arena (1,087); San Marcos, TX
February 27, 2021; 4:00 pm, ESPN+		at Texas State	L 57–61	7–18 (5–13)	17 – Nicholas	5 – Morency/Gonzales	8 – Gonzales	Strahan Arena (1,045); San Marcos, TX
Sun Belt tournament
March 5, 2021; 5:30 pm, ESPN+	(W6)	vs. (E3) South Alabama; First round	L 72–80	7–19	14 – Gonzales	14 – Morency	4 – Morency	Pensacola Bay Center; Pensacola, FL
*Non-conference game. ^{#}Rankings from AP Poll. (#) Tournament seedings in parentheses. All times are in Central.
