= Carver College =

Private college in Atlanta, Georgia, United States

Coordinates: 33.7233°N 84.5154°W

Carver College is a private Bible college located in Atlanta, Georgia, United States.

It was established in 1943 as the Carver Bible Institute. The institute was founded by Solomon Randolph, a Black pastor in Atlanta, and Grace and Talmage Payne, graduates of the Moody Bible Institute. It was named after the agricultural scientist George Washington Carver. The campus underwent major renovations in 1997, including remodeling the administration building, the gymnasium and establishing a new bookstore for the campus. The college was accredited from the Association for Biblical Higher Education in 2006. In 2009, the Carver Bible College was renamed Carver College.

As of 2017, Carver had a total enrollment of 60 students. The undergraduate tuition was approximately $12,000. It offers undergraduate programs in Business Administration, Psychology, and Biblical Studies.

== Athletics ==
Carver's athletics teams are known as the Cougars and compete in the National Christian College Athletic Association. The athletic program was established in 1998.

== Notable alumni ==
- Tony Evans, pastor
