= Joshua Wolson =

American judge (born 1974)

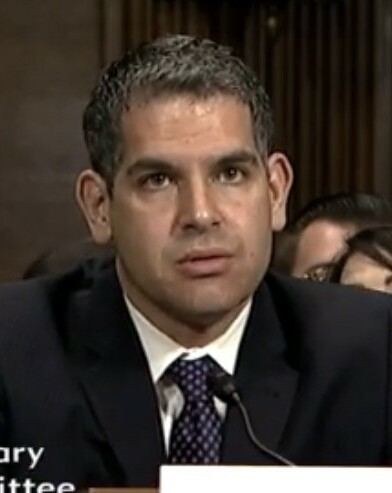

Judge of the United States District Court for the Eastern District of Pennsylvania
- Incumbent
- Assumed office May 28, 2019
- Appointed by: Donald Trump
- Preceded by: James Knoll Gardner

Personal details
- Born: Joshua David Wolson; 1974 (age 51–52) Ann Arbor, Michigan, U.S.
- Education: University of Pennsylvania (BA); Harvard University (JD)

Joshua David Wolson (born 1974) is a United States district judge of the United States District Court for the Eastern District of Pennsylvania.

== Early life and education ==
Wolson was born in Ann Arbor, Michigan, in 1974. He attended and graduated from Parkland High School in South Whitehall Township, Pennsylvania, and then attended the University of Pennsylvania, where he graduated with a Bachelor of Arts magna cum laude in 1996. Three years later, in 1999, he was awarded his Juris Doctor cum laude from Harvard Law School.

== Career ==
After graduating from Harvard Law School in 1999, he served as a law clerk to Judge Jan E. DuBois, a federal judge in the U.S. District Court for the Eastern District of Pennsylvania from 1999 to 2000. He then joined Covington & Burling in Washington, D.C., where he served for eight years as an associate in the firm's litigation and antitrust groups.

He returned to Philadelphia and joined Dilworth Paxson's litigation group in 2008, becoming a partner in 2010. He represented plaintiffs and defendants in complex litigation matters, including antitrust, RICO, intellectual property, procurement, and civil rights disputes. He also served as a co-chair of the firm's Plaintiffs' Rights Practice Group and a member of the firm's executive committee.

== Federal judicial service ==
On May 10, 2018, President Donald Trump announced his intent to nominate Wolson to serve as a United States district judge for the United States District Court for the Eastern District of Pennsylvania after the seat was vacated by Judge James Knoll Gardner, who assumed senior status on April 3, 2017. On May 15, 2018, Wolson's nomination was sent to the Senate. On July 11, 2018, a hearing on his nomination was held before the Senate Judiciary Committee. On September 13, 2018, his nomination was reported out of committee by a 13–8 vote.

On January 3, 2019, his nomination was returned to the President under Rule XXXI, Paragraph 6 of the United States Senate. On January 23, 2019, President Trump announced his intent to renominate Wolson for a federal judgeship. His nomination was sent to the Senate later that day. On February 7, 2019, his nomination was reported out of committee by a 14–8 vote. On May 1, 2019, the Senate invoked cloture on his nomination by a 64–35 vote. On May 2, 2019, his nomination was confirmed by a 65–33 vote. He received his judicial commission on May 28, 2019.

Wolson occupies the same federal judgeship seat for the Eastern District of Pennsylvania that he previously clerked for, having clerked for Judge Jan E. DuBois, who preceded Judge James K. Gardner, who ultimately preceded Wolson.

Wolson has demonstrated a commitment to his local Pennsylvania community. In February 2025, Wolson returned to his alma mater, Parkland High School in South Whitehall Township, to hold a live hearing in front of the school's AP American Government students and members of the school's law club. After the hearing, Wolson answered questions from the students in attendance.

=== Notable cases and rulings ===
On the bench, Wolson has gained notoriety for using pop culture references, especially in introductions, to illustrate legal concepts. For example, in a 2021 free speech lawsuit, Crash Proof Retirement, LLC v. Paul M. Price, Wolson quoted Taylor Swift to explain that critical opinions do not inherently amount to commercial speech for the basis of a Lanham Act claim, writing:

If free speech means anything, it means that you do not get to sue people because you don't like their opinion of you. In the immortal words of Taylor Swift, although "haters gonna hate, hate, hate . . . ," sometimes you just have to "shake it off." "Shake it off," however, Crash Proof Retirement did not. Instead, it sued Paul M. Price . . . .

Wolson has also made references to Philadelphia. On February 18, 2021, in Julie Darrup v. Wal-Mart Stores East, LP, Wolson wrote:

Philadelphia has much to recommend it. World class cuisine. Great universities. Gritty. But one thing that Philadelphia, and the Eastern District of Pennsylvania as a whole, lacks is any connection to this case. The case arises from a slip-and-fall at a Walmart store in Coal Township, Pennsylvania, in the Middle District of Pennsylvania. Even though the accident occurred there, Plaintiff Julie Darrup channels her inner W.C. Fields and argues that she'd rather be in Philadelphia. The problem is that she never lived in this District, never got treatment in this District, and never had any other connection to this District. The Court will therefore grant Walmart's Motion to transfer this case to the Middle District of Pennsylvania pursuant to 28 U.S.C. § 1404(a).

Similarly, in a March 10, 2021 ruling in Tomei v. Office of the 32nd Judicial District of Delaware County, Wolson combined references to both pop culture and Philadelphia sports:

The Court does not have the power to make the world a perfect place. If it could, Jim Fregosi would not have pulled Roger Mason in Game 6 of the 1993 World Series, the Phillies wouldn't have traded Ryne Sandberg for Ivan DeJesus, and the 76ers would have drafted Brad Daugherty instead of trading for Roy Hinson. And, of course, Simba would have never gone down into that gorge. But courts only have the power to grant relief afforded under the law. Instead, parties must live with the wisdom of Timon: "Look kid. Bad things happen, and you can't do anything about it . . . ."

In a March 2026 ruling, Wolson employed sci-fi analogies to explain a patent dispute between Moderna, Arbutus Biopharma, and Genevant Sciences regarding the lipid nanoparticle (LNP) delivery technology used in COVID-19 vaccines. Framing the allegations that Moderna infringed on patents during the government's Operation Warp Speed, Wolson wrote:

In Star Trek, members of Starfleet must observe the Prime Directive, even as they jump into or come out of warp speed. In this case, Arbutus Biopharma Corp. and Genevant Sciences GmbH (collectively, "Arbutus") claim that during the U.S. Government's own Operation Warp Speed to find a vaccine for Covid-19, Moderna Inc. and ModernaTX, Inc. (collectively, "Moderna") violated the Prime Directive of patent law: don't copy other people's inventions. Moderna asks me to hold as a matter of law that when it jumped to warp speed to make a Covid-19 vaccine, it did so for the Government . . . .

Wolson's subsequent summary judgment rulings on the eve of trial spurred a $2.25 billion settlement, the largest disclosed patent settlement in pharmaceutical industry history.

== Memberships ==
On his Senate Judiciary Committee questionnaire, Wolson reported being a member of the Federalist Society, the American Bar Association, Republican Jewish Coalition, and the Republican National Lawyers Association.

== See also ==
- List of Jewish American jurists

Legal offices
Preceded by James Knoll Gardner	Judge of the United States District Court for the Eastern District of Pennsylvania; 2019–present	Incumbent
