= Kenny Yeboah =

American football player (born 1998)

No. 45 – Arizona Cardinals
- Position: Tight end
- Roster status: Practice squad/injured

Personal information
- Born: October 30, 1998 (age 28); Providence, Rhode Island, U.S.
- Listed height: 6 ft 4 in (1.93 m)
- Listed weight: 250 lb (113 kg)

Career information
- High school: Parkland (South Whitehall Township, Pennsylvania)
- College: Temple (2016–2019); Ole Miss (2020)
- NFL draft: 2021: undrafted

Career history
- New York Jets (2021–2024); Detroit Lions (2025); Arizona Cardinals (2026–present)*
- * Offseason or practice squad member only

Awards and highlights
- Third-team All-SEC (2020)

Career NFL statistics as of 2024
- Receptions: 9
- Receiving yards: 111
- Receiving touchdowns: 1
- Stats at Pro Football Reference

Kenneth Yeboah (born October 30, 1998) is an American professional football tight end for the Arizona Cardinals of the National Football League (NFL). He played college football for the Temple Owls and Ole Miss Rebels.

== Early life ==
Yeboah was born in Providence, Rhode Island. Following his sophomore year in high school, his family moved to Allentown, Pennsylvania. He attended Parkland High School in South Whitehall Township, Pennsylvania, where he was a starter on the basketball and football teams. Yeboah had 47 receptions for 773 yards and 13 touchdowns in his junior season. As a senior, he caught 72 passes for 1,160 yards and 14 touchdowns and had five interceptions on defense and was named Class AAAA All-State.

Yeboah committed to play college football at Temple over offers from Towson, Old Dominion, and New Hampshire.

== College career ==
As a freshman, Yeboah played in one game and caught a 15-yard pass before redshirting the season in order to transition from wide receiver to tight end. He had 14 receptions for 136 yards in his redshirt freshman season. Yeboah finished his redshirt sophomore season with 13 catches for 154 yards and one touchdown. After the season, Yeboah entered the transfer portal to play at another program for his final season of eligibility.

Yeboah originally committed to transfer to Baylor in order to play for Matt Rhule, who had previously coached him at Temple, but de-committed after Rhule left the school to become the head coach of the Carolina Panthers. He ultimately transferred to Ole Miss for his final season. Yeboah set a school record for most receiving yards in a game by a tight end with 181 on seven receptions and two touchdowns on October 10, 2020, in a 63–48 loss to Alabama. He finished the season with 27 receptions for 524 yards and six touchdowns.

On December 17, 2020, Yeboah announced that he was forgoing the remainder of the 2020 season and entering the 2021 NFL draft.

== Professional career ==
Pre-draft measurables
Height	Weight	Arm length	Hand span	Wingspan	40-yard dash	10-yard split	20-yard split	Vertical jump	Broad jump	Bench press
6 ft 3 7/8 in (1.93 m)	250 lb (113 kg)	34 1/8 in (0.87 m)	9 1/2 in (0.24 m)	6 ft 8 1/8 in (2.04 m)	4.75 s	1.70 s	2.69 s	34.0 in (0.86 m)	9 ft 8 in (2.95 m)	15 reps
All values from Pro Day

=== New York Jets ===
Yeboah signed with the New York Jets as an undrafted free agent on May 7, 2021. He was waived on August 31, and re-signed to the practice squad the next day. Yeboah was elevated to the active roster on October 9, for the team's week 5 game against the Atlanta Falcons and made his NFL debut in the game. On November 16, Yeboah was signed to the active roster. In a January 2, 2022, game against the Tampa Bay Buccaneers, Yeboah collected his first two NFL receptions for a total of 36 yards, both from quarterback Zach Wilson.

On August 30, 2022, Yeboah was waived by the Jets and signed to the practice squad the next day. He was promoted to the active roster on November 5.

On August 30, 2023, Yeboah was placed on injured reserve. He was activated on December 6.

On August 27, 2024, Yeboah was placed on injured reserve. On October 31, the Jets reactivated him and Yeboah made his season debut in the Thursday Night Football win over the Houston Texans. In Week 11 of the 2024 season, Yeboah scored his first NFL touchdown against the Indianapolis Colts on an 11-yard pass from Aaron Rodgers.

=== Detroit Lions ===
On March 14, 2025, Yeboah signed a one-year contract with the Detroit Lions. He was placed on injured reserve on August 10, due to an undisclosed injury. Yeboah was released with an injury settlement on November 4.

=== Arizona Cardinals ===
On June 11, 2026, Yeboah signed with the Arizona Cardinals. He was placed on injured reserve on August 8, and later released. On October 6, Yeboah was re-signed to the practice squad.
