= Kazoo (magazine) =

American magazine

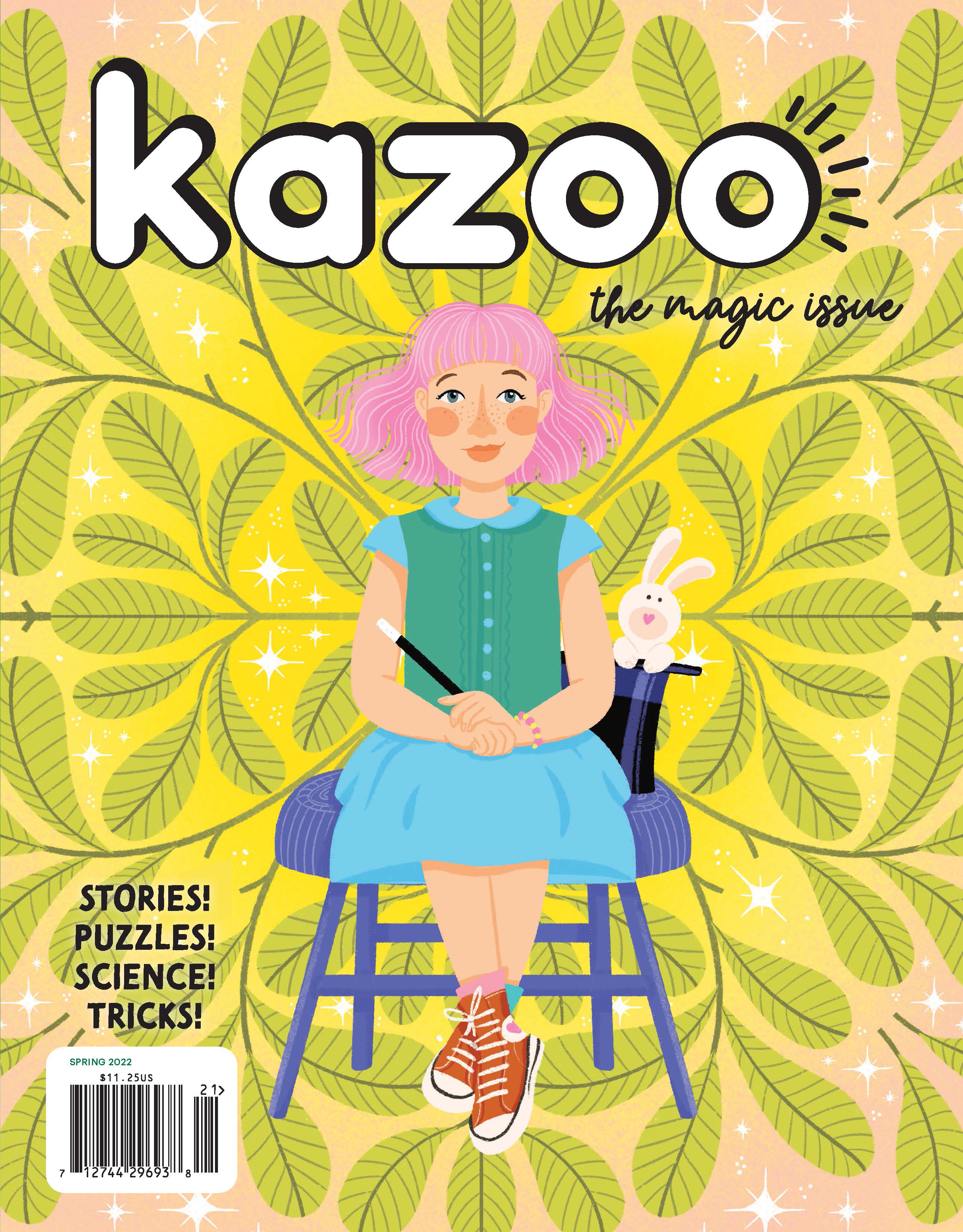
- Kazoo Magazine, Issue 24 "The Magic Issue"
- Editor-in-chief: Erin Bried
- Categories: children
- Frequency: 4 issues/year
- Publisher: Erin Bried
- Founded: 2016; 10 years ago
- Country: United States
- Based in: New York City, U.S.
- Language: English
- Website: kazoomagazine.com
- ISSN: 2638-0196

Kazoo is a print magazine for children, based in Brooklyn, New York City. It was the first children's magazine to be awarded the General Excellence—"Special Interest" award by the National Magazine Awards in 2019.

== Founding ==
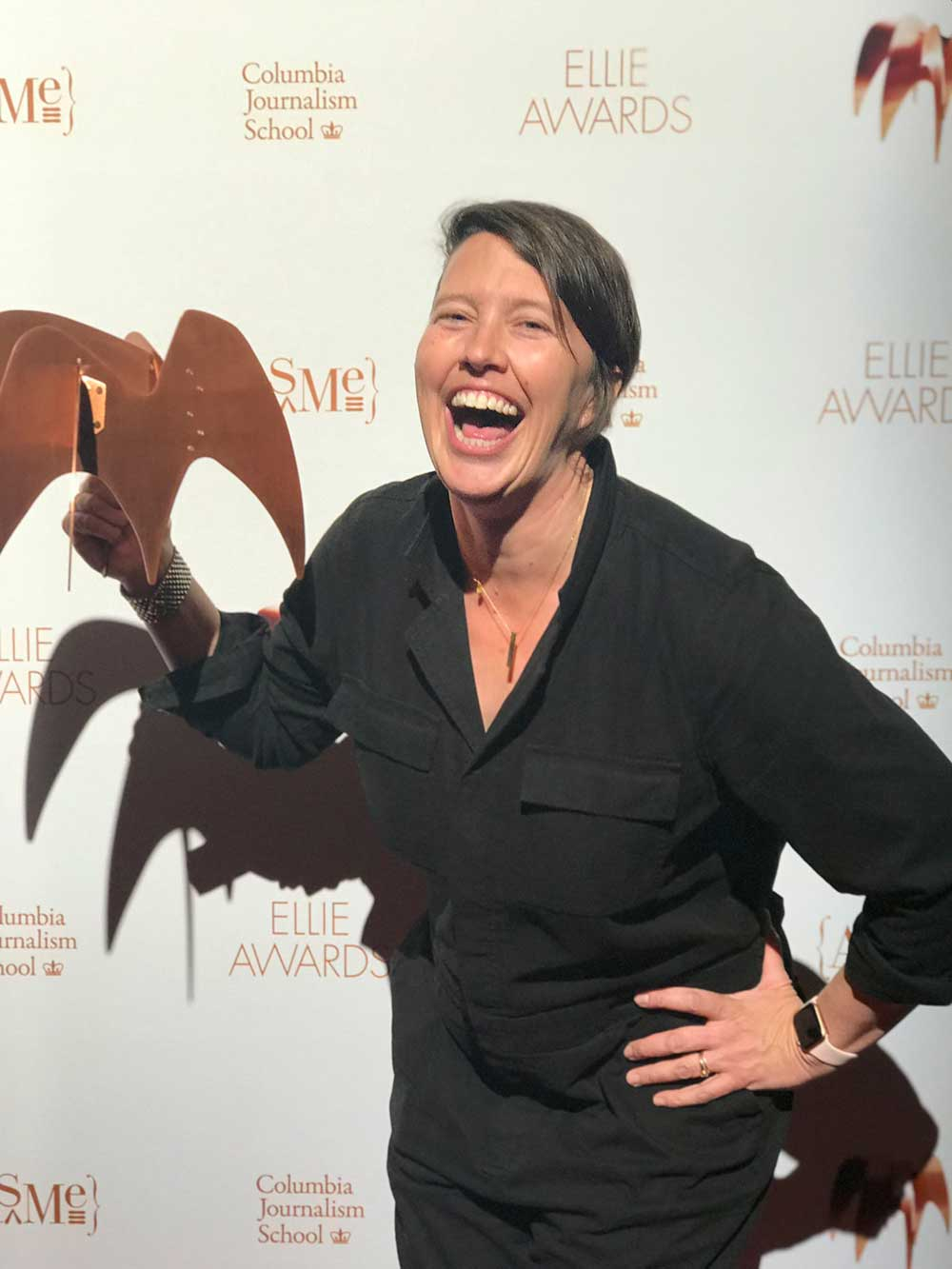
Erin Bried, founder of Kazoo magazine, with her National Magazine Award in 2019

Kazoo magazine is independently owned by its editor-in-chief Erin Bried. Prior to founding Kazoo, Bried worked for 18 years as a writer and editor for Condé Nast women’s magazines, including Glamour and Self. In 2022, Bried was added to the distinguished alumni Wall of Honor for founding Kazoo by the Parkland School District Education Foundation.

In 2016, Kazoo magazine launched via crowdfunding. 3,136 backers contributed $171,215 to fund the magazine. The first issue was published in July 2016, and included contributions by Alison Bechdel, Diana Nyad, Mickalene Thomas, Jacqueline Woodson, Lucy Knisley, Doreen Cronin, and Meenakshi Wadhwa.

== Description ==
Kazoo is a quarterly magazine, published 4 times a year. Each issue is 64 pages long and includes puzzles, stories, comics, games, interviews, and crafts. The magazine is aimed at girls aged 5–12 and has attracted contributors such as Ruth Bader Ginsburg, Jane Goodall and Ellen DeGeneres.

The magazine's editorial stance has been described as "feminist". Its tagline is "for girls who aren't afraid to make some noise."

In 2020, Bried published Noisemakers: 25 Women Who Raised Their Voices & Changed the World, a collection of comics published by Knopf.

== Awards ==
- 2018–2020 – named a Parents' Choice Gold Award.
- 2019 – won the National Magazine Award for General Excellence, Special Interest.
- 2022 (twice), 2021, 2017 – a finalist for a National Magazine Award.
- 2020 – Noisemakers won a Pop Culture Classroom award for Excellence in Graphic Literature.
- 2022 - named a Merit Winner by The Society of Publication Designers.

== Regular features ==
Every issue of Kazoo is arranged around a theme, and divided into categories:

- Tickle (puzzles and games)
- Explore (math & sciences)
- Grow (nature & biology)
- Tinker (engineering)
- Read (original fiction)
- Feast (recipe)
- Comic (historical comic)
- Share (contributions from Kazoo readers)
- Believe (inspirational poster)

Some issues also include:

- Create (art)
- Feel (emotions)
- Play (sports)
- Rally (community activism)
- Question (critical thinking)

Kazoo issues
Issue	Fiction	Comic	Recipe	Art
1	Doreen Cronin	Lucy Knisley on Betty Robinson	Fany Gerson (chef)	Mickalene Thomas (artist)
2	Polly Horvath	Rosemary Valero-O'Connell on Hallie Daggett	Melba Wilson (chef, Melba's)	Emil Ferris (artist); Catherine Opie (photographer)
3	Kathi Appelt	Jen Wang on Emily Warren Roebling	Joanne Chang (chef)	Amy Sillman (artist)
4	Lauren Wolk	Shannon Wright on Bessie Coleman	Amanda Cohen (chef)	Vexta (artist)
5	Emma Straub	Alitha Martinez on Josephine Baker	Jessica Koslow (chef, Squirl)	Beatriz Milhazes (artist)
6	Jane Yolen	Yao Xiao on Raye Montague	Suchanan Aksornnan (chef, Baoburg)	Bisa Butler (artist)
7	Meg Wolitzer	Rebecca Mock on Ida Lewis	Sarah Sanneh (chef, Pies ‘n Thighs)	Judith Schaechter (artist)
8	Joyce Carol Oates	Lucy Knisley on Julia Child	Dorrie Greenspan (baker, author)	Saya Woolfalk (artist)
9	Kathi Appelt	Brittney Williams on Wangarĩ Maathai	Alice Waters (chef, restauranteur)	Barbara Teller Ornelas (weaver)
10	Angela Flournoy	Ashley A. Woods on Rosa Parks	Leah Chase (chef)	The Guerrilla Girls (art activists); Liza Donnelly (cartoonist)
11	Bumni Laditan	Emily Flake on Eleanor Roosevelt	Libby Willis (chef, Meme’s Diner)	Ashley Longshore (artist)
12	Karina Yan Glaser	Lucy Bellwood on Jeanne Baret	Diana Hardeman (ice cream maker)	Leslie King-Hammond (art historian)
13	Elisabeth Egan	Kerstin A. La Cross on Rachel Carson	Mollie Katzen (author,Moosewood Cookbook)	Ann Carrington (artist)
14	Kristen Arnett	Steenz on Marian Anderson	Melissa Elsen and Emily Elsen (owners, Four and Twenty Blackbirds)	Camille Wallala (artist)
15	Kimberly Brubaker Bradley	Alitha Martinez on Mary Fields	Sherry Delamarter (owner, Cowgirl)	Kathie Sever (designer); Kristen Visbol (sculptor)
16	Erin Entrada Kelly	Rosemary Valero-O'Connell on Florence Nightingale	Bhima Thapa-Magar (owner, Just Bakery)	Shoplifter (fibre artist)
17	Meg Medina	Kate Leth on Grace Hopper	Jeni Britton Bauer (Jeni's Splendid Ice Cream maker)	Deborah Kass (artist)
18	Carmen Maria Machado	Micheline Hess on Toni Morrison	Rawia Bishara (owner, Tanoreen restaurant)	Faith Ringgold (artist)
19	Laura Lippman	Molly Brooks on Kate Warne	Alicia Wong (baker)	
20	Veera Hiranandani	Kat Leyh on Grace Hopper	Allison Arevalo (chef, Pasta Louise)	
21	Renée Watson	Maris Wicks on Katherine Switzer	Zoë François (chef, author)	Maya Hayuk (artist)
22	Kira Jane Buxton	Ellen Crenshaw on Dian Fossey	Bobbie Lloyd (baker, Magnolia Bakery)	Alice Tangerini (botanical artist)
23	A. S. King	MariNaomi on Yayoi Kusama	Teri Culletto (bread baker, artist)	Amy Sherald, Julie Mehretu, Nina Chanel Abney, Xylor Jane (artists)
24	Erin Entrada Kelly	Sophie Escabasse on Adelaide Herrmann	Pamela Weekes and Connie McDonald (Levain Bakery co-owners)	Janet Echelman (artist)
25	Lauren Wolk	Maris Wicks on Eugenie Clark	Jen Karoni (owner, Cabot's Candy)	Lisa Congdon (artist)
