= Erin Bried =

American magazine publisher

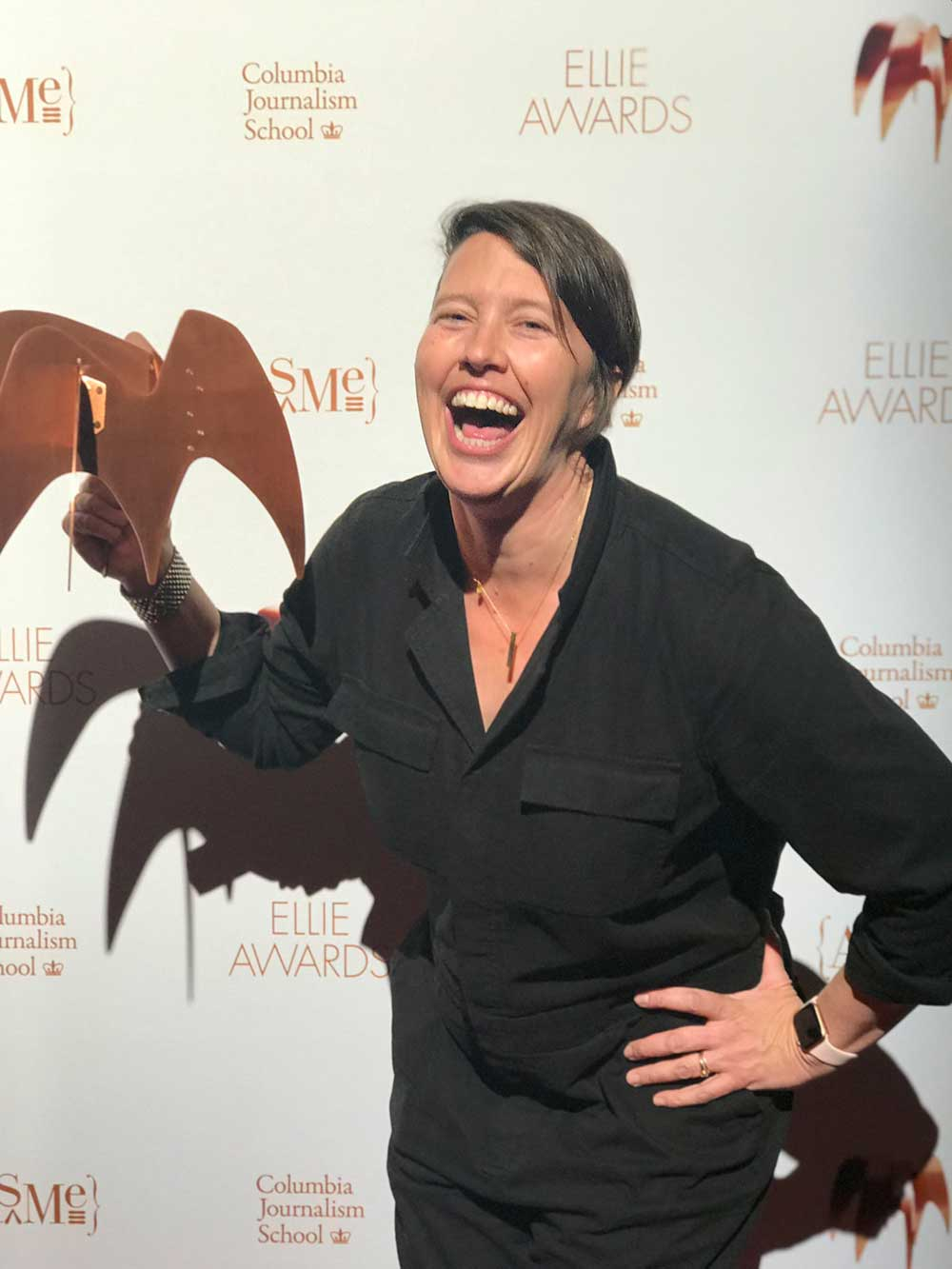
- Bried with her National Magazine Award in 2019
- Born: Allentown, Pennsylvania, U.S.
- Education: Pennsylvania State University
- Known for: Editor-in-chief, Kazoo magazine
- Spouse: Holly Bemiss (m. 2008)
- Children: 2
- Website: kazoomagazine.com

Erin Bried is an American publisher, author, and the founder and editor-in-chief of Kazoo magazine, the first children's magazine to win the National Magazine Award for General Excellence, in 2019. She is the author of three books, including How to Sew a Button: and other Nifty Things Your Grandmother Knew.

== Early life and education ==
Bried was born in Allentown, Pennsylvania, to William Bried, a lawyer, and Claire Bried, a teacher. She attended Parkland High School in South Whitehall Township, Pennsylvania where she was captain of the soccer team in her senior year and was nominated for the first "Soccer Scholar Athlete Award" from the Eastern Pennsylvania Conference in 1992.

Bried then attended Pennsylvania State University’s Donald P. Bellisario College of Communications, where she graduated with a degree in advertising in 1996.

== Career ==
Between 1997 and 2015 Bried worked at Condé Nast as an editor at Glamour and then editor-at-large at Self. She was also a writer and editor for Golf for Women, Women’s Health and Good Housekeeping.

Bried decided to create Kazoo magazine in 2016 in response to a shopping trip with her 5-year old daughter, where the covers of the girls’ magazines they looked at “all had dolls, lip gloss and princesses on them; they all had articles about ‘how to get pretty hair, how to have good manners’". In creating a print-only magazine, Bried saw the “magazine as an opportunity to politicize girls at a critical moment in their lives, to ‘shore up their foundation’ of empowerment before the pressures of patriarchy set in during adolescence.”

Bried is the only full-time staff member of the magazine, she writes everything except the fiction. On behalf of Kazoo she has appeared on Today, Better TV and NPR.

=== Kickstarter campaign ===
Bried launched a Kickstarter campaign in March 2016, with the aim of raising US$150,000. Two of Bried’s friends, both filmmakers, made a launch video that “went viral” and Neil Gaiman and Roxane Gay tweeted about it. Within 30 days the campaign had raised $171,215 from 3,000 people. At that point, it was the highest funded journalism campaign on Kickstarter (this record has since been superseded). Almost one third of the donations came from first-time backers.

== Publications ==
Bried has published or edited the following books:

- Noisemakers: 25 Women who Raised their Voices and Changed the World (2020) Editor. Pub. Knopf Books for Young Readers ISBN 9780525580171
- How to Sew a Button: and other Nifty Things Your Grandmother Knew (2009) Pub. Ballantine Books ISBN 978-0385365208
- How to Build a Fire: and other Handy Things Your Grandfather Knew (2010) Pub. Ballantine ISBN 978-0385365192
- How to Rock your Baby: and other Timeless Tips for Modern Moms (2012) Pub. Hyperion ISBN 978-1401324599

== Awards and honours ==
In 2022, Bried was named a Parkland School District Education Foundation Distinguished Alumna and her name was added to its Wall of Honor.

== Personal life ==
As a student at Penn State, Bried met Holly Bemiss. In 1997, they moved to New York City and married in 2008 at Prospect Park, Brooklyn. A photo of Bried and Bemiss at their wedding ceremony appeared on the cover of New York Magazine’s 2008 winter issue. Bemiss is a literary agent. They have two children.
