= Parkland High School (Pennsylvania) =

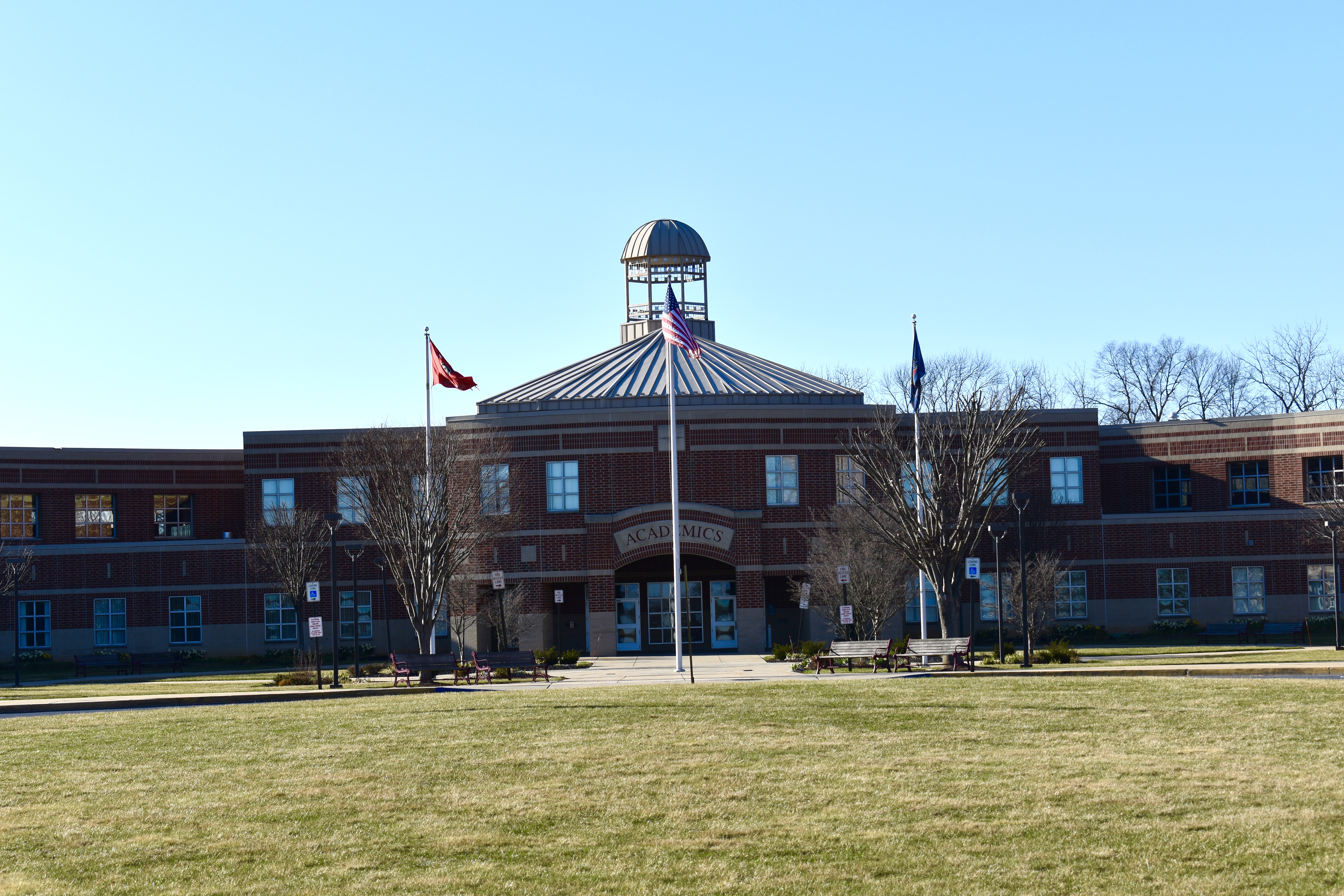
- Parkland High School in March 2020

Location
- 2700 North Cedar Crest Boulevard; Allentown, Pennsylvania 18104; United States; 40°38′20″N 75°32′47″W

Information
- Type: Public high school
- Established: 1949; 77 years ago
- School district: Parkland School District
- Superintendent: Mark Madson
- NCES School ID: 421851002829
- Principal: Nathan Davidson
- Teaching staff: 202.2 (on an FTE basis)
- Grades: 9th–12th
- Enrollment: 3,279 (2024–25)
- Student to teacher ratio: 16.22
- Campus type: Suburban
- Colors: Red and gray
- Athletics conference: Eastern Pennsylvania Conference
- Nickname: Trojans
- Rival: Emmaus High School
- Newspaper: The Trumpet
- Yearbook: Par Key
- Website: phs.parklandsd.org

Parkland High School is a large public high school in South Whitehall Township, Pennsylvania, near Allentown. The school serves students in grades 9–12 and is the only high school in Parkland School District.

As of the 2024–25 school year, it had a student population of 3,279, according to National Center for Education Statistics data, making it the fourth-largest public high school in Pennsylvania.

== History ==
=== 20th century ===
Parkland High School was formed in 1949 when North Whitehall Township and South Whitehall Township merged to create Parkland Union School District. The following year, in 1950, Upper Macungie Township also joined the school district.

Parkland High School's predecessor, South Whitehall High School, was located in the present-day Troxell Building at 2219 North Cedar Crest Boulevard. In 1954, a larger building was built to serve as Parkland High School, located on Route 309 in Orefield, and it served as the high school for 45 years.

In 1999, the new and current Parkland High School building on Cedar Crest Boulevard was opened due to overcapacity of the Orefield building. The school was designed by the architecture firm Armstrong, Torseth, Skold & Rydeen and was based on two of the firm's prior high school buildings in Minnesota and Illinois. The old school, in turn, was renovated and renamed Orefield Middle School, which replaced Troxell Junior High School.

=== 21st century ===
In April 2012, the online news outlet HuffPost reported that, viewed from above, the layout of the current building and grounds closely approximate the shape of the Millennium Falcon, a spacecraft featured in the Star Wars films. School officials claim that the design was not deliberate.

The Parkland High School campus spans 128 acres and has three entrances, including one for the main academic and administration entrance, one for the cafeteria and gymnasium, and one for the auditorium. The entrances are labeled by academics, athletics, and arts.

== Academics ==
Parkland High School offers 25 AP courses, including AP Literature, AP Psychology, AP Statistics, AP Spanish, AP Calculus, and others, with a pass rate of 86%. The school has an average SAT score of 1240 and average ACT score of 29. The average graduation rate at Parkland is 95%. The state testing scores have an average of 86% in reading and 80% in mathematics.

As of 2022, Parkland High School is ranked 123rd in the state of Pennsylvania. About a quarter of the students participate in some type of AP classes.

== Activities ==
Parkland High School has several dozen extracurricular organizations for students.

In the August 2010, Parkland High School's theatrical production of Les Misérables was featured in the documentary Most Valuable Players, featuring the school's competition against neighboring Emmaus High School in Emmaus and Freedom High School in Bethlehem Township as the three large high schools participated in the Freddy Awards competition, which recognizes the best theatrical productions by Lehigh Valley-based high schools.

== Athletics ==
Parkland competes athletically in the Eastern Pennsylvania Conference (EPC) in the Pennsylvania Interscholastic Athletic Association, one of the premier high school athletic divisions in the nation. Cumulatively among all of its sports, Parkland has secured fourteen Pennsylvania state championship titles.

=== Baseball ===
The baseball program has won 17 conference championships and 7 district titles. The program has 11 athletes that have been inducted to the Parkland High School Hall of Fame. The program has a record of 854-416-1 with a winning percentage of 0.672 in 73 seasons.

=== Basketball (Boys) ===
The boys basketball team has won 6 conference championships and 10 district titles. There have been 7 players inducted into the Parkland High School Hall of Fame. The program has had 8 1,000 point scorers. The program as a entirety has a record of 1,145-698 with a winning percentage of 0.621 in its 74 seasons.

Sam Iorio attended Parkland High School, playing guard and forward for its Trojans basketball team. He graduated in 2017 as the school's all-time leading career scorer with 1,892 points as he averaged 16.5 points and 6.5 rebounds per game. He was named Class 6A Player of the Year and First Team All-Pennsylvania, and was named Player of the Year in both 2015 and 2016 by The Morning Call.

=== Basketball (Girls) ===
The Parkland Girls basketball team has an overall record throughout program history of 807-621, which has a winning percentage of 0.565. The program has 8 1,000-point scorers throughout the program with the most recent being in the 2006-2007 season. The program has 3 conference championships, 4 district championships, and 1 state title in the 2005-2006 season.

=== Cross country (Girls) ===
The Parkland girls cross country team has a record of 449-179-2 over 40 seasons with a winning percentage of 0.714. The program has won 7 conference championships, 5 district championships, and 1 state title. They have 3 athletes that have been inducted into the Parkland Hall of Fame.

=== Football ===
The football program at Parkland High School has won 18 conference championships, 10 district titles, and 1 state title in its 69 years as a program. Their overall record is 454-269-21, with a winning percentage of 0.624. There are 30 athletes that have been inducted into the Parkland Hall of Fame, 29 athletes with 1,000 rushing yards, 16 athletes with 1,000 passing yards, and one athlete with 1,000 receiving yards.

=== Ice hockey ===
Parkland High School also is one of eleven Lehigh Valley-area high schools with an ice hockey team; the team competes in the Lehigh Valley Scholastic Ice Hockey League. The team has won the LVSHL district championship 14 times, as well as making the state finals in 2013.

=== Soccer (Girls) ===
The Parkland girls soccer team has an overall record of 682-141-42 with a winning percentage of 0.813 over 39 seasons as a program. They have received over 17 League/Conference Titles, including Lehigh Valley Conference and Eastern Pennsylvania Conference Titles. Under Coach Al Haddad, they have won 9 championship District XI Titles and have maintained a dominant 0.832 winning percentage during his 20 year career at Parkland. 2016-2017 season was the best season for the team, with 25 wins and 1 loss.

=== Soccer (Boys) ===
The Parkland boys soccer team has an overall record of 615-303-48 with a winning percentage of 0.661 over 47 seasons as a program. They have won 11 conference and 9 district championships. 13 athletes have been inducted into the Parkland's Hall of Fame. The most league wins for the program was 17, which occurred in 2002. The most overall wins occurred in 1998, with 25. The most goals scored by the team in a single season is 115, and the fewest goals allowed in a season was 10. The best record the team has had was 17-0.

=== Softball ===
The Parkland softball program has a record of 912-241 with a winning percentage of 0.791 over 53 seasons. They have won 5 state titles, 27 conference championships, and 16 district titles. They have had 20 athletes inducted into the hall of fame.

=== Swimming and diving (Boys) ===
The swimming program has won 8 conference championships and 12 district championships. The program has a winning percentage of 0.724 with a record of 508-192-5 over 62 seasons.

=== Swimming and diving (Girls) ===
The girls swimming and diving program has a program overall record of 545-124-2 with a winning percentage of 0.814. The program has won 19 conference titles, 25 district championships, and 3 state titles in its 54 seasons. The program has 40 athletes that are in the Parkland Hall of Fame.

=== Tennis (Boys) ===
The boys tennis program at Parkland has three athletes that have been inducted into the Parkland Hall of Fame. they have a winning record with a winning percentage of 0.814. They have won 671 matches, lost 151, and dragged 5. They have one 23 conference championships and 11 district titles.

=== Tennis (Girls) ===
The girls tennis program has a winning percentage of 0.827 with 633-132 with 18 conference championships and 11 district titles. They have had one athlete inducted into the Parkland Hall of Fame in the 2011-2012 season.

=== Volleyball (Boys) ===
In 2015 and 2023, the boys volleyball team won the PIAA AAA state championships. The team also lost in the 2024 PIAA AAA state championship. The boys volleyball team has won 15 conference championships, 12 district championships, and 2 state titles in its 38 seasons as a program. The program has produced 23 athletes and 2 teams into the Parkland High School hall of fame. The volleyball program as a whole has a record of 563-173 with a winning percentage of 0.765.

=== Volleyball (Girls) ===
In 2011, 2014, and 2015, the girls volleyball team won the PIAA AAA state championships. The girls volleyball program at Parkland High School has 9 conference championships, 11 district championships, and three state championships. The girls team has had 27 girls inducted to the Parkland Hall of Fame. The record over 42 seasons for the girls volleyball program is 577-289 with a win percentage of 0.666

== Notable alumni ==
- Erin Bried, founder and editor-in-chief, Kazoo magazine
- Brick Bronsky, former actor and professional wrestler
- Dave Calhoun, former president and chief executive officer of Boeing
- Michaela Conlin, actress, Fox's Bones
- Greg DeLong, former professional football player, Baltimore Ravens, Jacksonville Jaguars, and Minnesota Vikings
- Christopher Fonzone, former U.S. assistant attorney general
- Adam Gristick, assistant professional football coach, New Orleans Saints
- Sam Iorio, professional basketball player, Hapoel Be'er Sheva B.C. in the Israeli Basketball Premier League
- Billy Kidman, former WWE professional wrestler
- Carmen Maria Machado, short story author, essayist, and critic
- Ryan Mackenzie, U.S. Representative
- Antoinette Maniatty, materials science professor, Rensselaer Polytechnic Institute
- Tim Massaquoi, former professional football player, Miami Dolphins
- Aimee Mullins, actress, World Trade Center
- Chris Renaud, director, Despicable Me, Despicable Me 2, The Lorax, and The Secret Life of Pets
- Adam Richman, indie pop singer
- Ishai Setton, film director, editor, and producer
- Andrea Tantaros, former Fox News television commentator
- Brant Weidner, former professional basketball player, San Antonio Spurs
- Lauren Weisberger, author, The Devil Wears Prada
- Andre Williams, former professional football player, New York Giants and Los Angeles Chargers, and 2014 Heisman Trophy finalist
- Joshua Wolson, U.S. federal judge, U.S. District Court for the Eastern District
- Kenny Yeboah, free agent professional football player
