= Maniatty =

Maniatty is a surname. Notable people with the surname include:

- Antoinette Maniatty (born 1965), American materials scientist
- Nick Constantine Maniatty (Nicco), American singer and songwriter
