= James Knoll Gardner =

American judge (1940–2017)

Senior Judge of the United States District Court for the Eastern District of Pennsylvania
- In office April 3, 2017 – April 26, 2017

Judge of the United States District Court for the Eastern District of Pennsylvania
- In office October 3, 2002 – April 3, 2017
- Appointed by: George W. Bush
- Preceded by: Jan E. DuBois
- Succeeded by: Joshua Wolson

Personal details
- Born: September 14, 1940 Allentown, Pennsylvania, U.S.
- Died: April 26, 2017 (aged 76)
- Education: Yale University (BA); Harvard Law School (JD)

Military service
- Allegiance: United States
- Branch/service: United States Navy
- Years of service: 1966–1993
- Rank: Captain
- Unit: JAG Corps

James Knoll Gardner (September 14, 1940 – April 26, 2017) was a United States district judge of the United States District Court for the Eastern District of Pennsylvania.

== Early life and education ==
Gardner was born in Allentown, Pennsylvania, on September 14, 1940. He received a Bachelor of Arts degree magna cum laude from Yale University in 1962 and a Juris Doctor from Harvard Law School in 1965. He was on active duty in the JAG Corps from 1966 to 1969, remaining a U.S. Naval Reserve JAG Corps officer from 1969 to 1993 and retiring as a Captain.

== Career ==
He was in private practice of law in Philadelphia from 1965 to 1966 and 1969 to 1970, and in Allentown from 1970 to 1981. He was Solicitor to the Treasurer of Lehigh County from 1971 to 1977. He was an Assistant District Attorney of Lehigh County from 1972 to 1977, and then First Assistant District Attorney of Lehigh County from 1977 to 1981. He was a judge on the Court of Common Pleas of Lehigh County from 1981 to 2002, serving as President Judge from 1997 to 2001.

=== U.S. District Court ===
On April 22, 2002, Gardner was nominated by President George W. Bush to a seat on the United States District Court for the Eastern District of Pennsylvania vacated by Jan E. DuBois. Gardner was confirmed by the United States Senate on October 2, 2002, and received his commission on October 3, 2002. He assumed senior status on April 3, 2017, serving in that status until his death on April 26, 2017.

== Sources ==
Legal offices
Preceded by Jan E. DuBois	Judge of the United States District Court for the Eastern District of Pennsylvania; 2002–2017	Succeeded by Joshua Wolson
