= Manasses Guth Covered Bridge =

- U.S. National Register of Historic Places
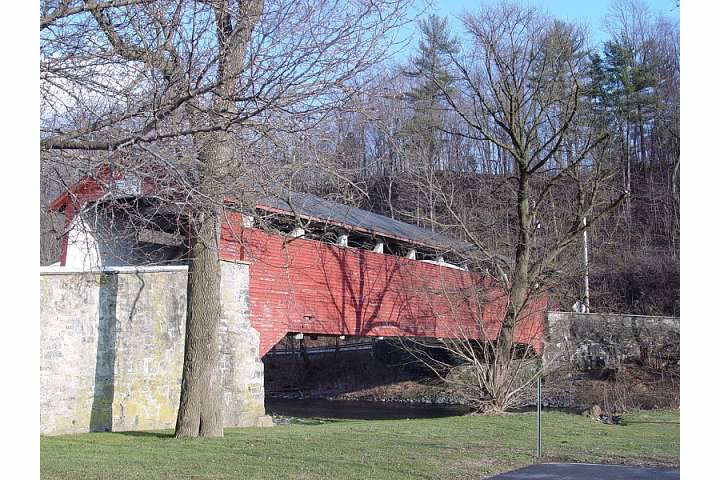
- Manasses Guth Covered Bridge in September 2012

- Location within Pennsylvania Location within the United States
- Location: South Whitehall Township, Pennsylvania, U.S.
- Coordinates: 40°37′42″N 75°33′13″W
- Area: 0.1 acres (0.040 ha)
- Built: 1858, 1882
- Architectural style: Burr arch truss
- MPS: Covered Bridges of the Delaware River Watershed TR
- NRHP reference No.: 80003559
- Added to NRHP: December 1, 1980

Manasses Guth Covered Bridge is a historic wooden covered bridge located at South Whitehall Township, Lehigh County, Pennsylvania. It is a 108-foot-long (33 m), Burr Truss bridge, constructed in 1858, and rebuilt in 1882. It has vertical siding. It crosses Jordan Creek.

It was listed on the National Register of Historic Places in 1980.
