= Wehr Covered Bridge =

- U.S. National Register of Historic Places
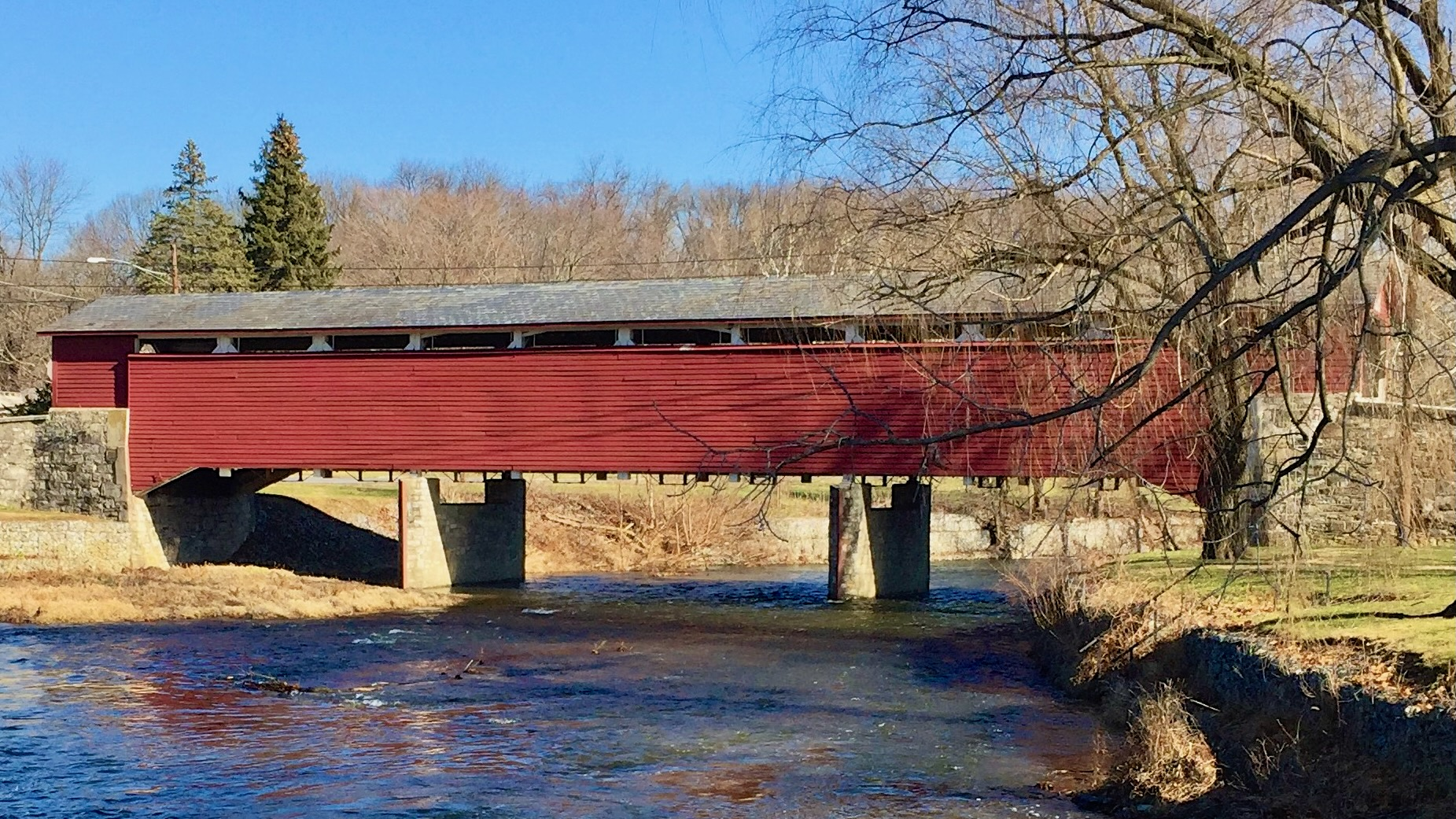
- Wehr Covered Bridge in December 2014

- Location within Pennsylvania Location within the United States
- Location: South Whitehall Township, Pennsylvania
- Coordinates: 40.62867°N 75.56972°W
- Built: 1841
- Architectural style: Burr truss
- MPS: Covered Bridges of the Delaware River Watershed TR
- NRHP reference No.: 80003561
- Added to NRHP: December 1, 1980

Wehr Covered Bridge is a historic wooden covered bridge located in South Whitehall Township of Lehigh County, Pennsylvania. It is a three span, 117-foot-long (36 m), Burr Truss bridge, constructed in 1841. It has horizontal siding and gable roof. It crosses Jordan Creek. The bridge was listed on the National Register of Historic Places in 1980 as part of the Covered Bridges of the Delaware River Watershed Multiple Property Submission (MPS).

After an incident in July 2014 in which a grossly overweight truck crossed the bridge, it was closed for several days for inspection. The bridge did not sustain significant structural damage, but county officials decided to reduce the posted weight limit from 20,000 pounds (9,000 kg) to 8,000 pounds (4,000 kg).

== Gallery ==
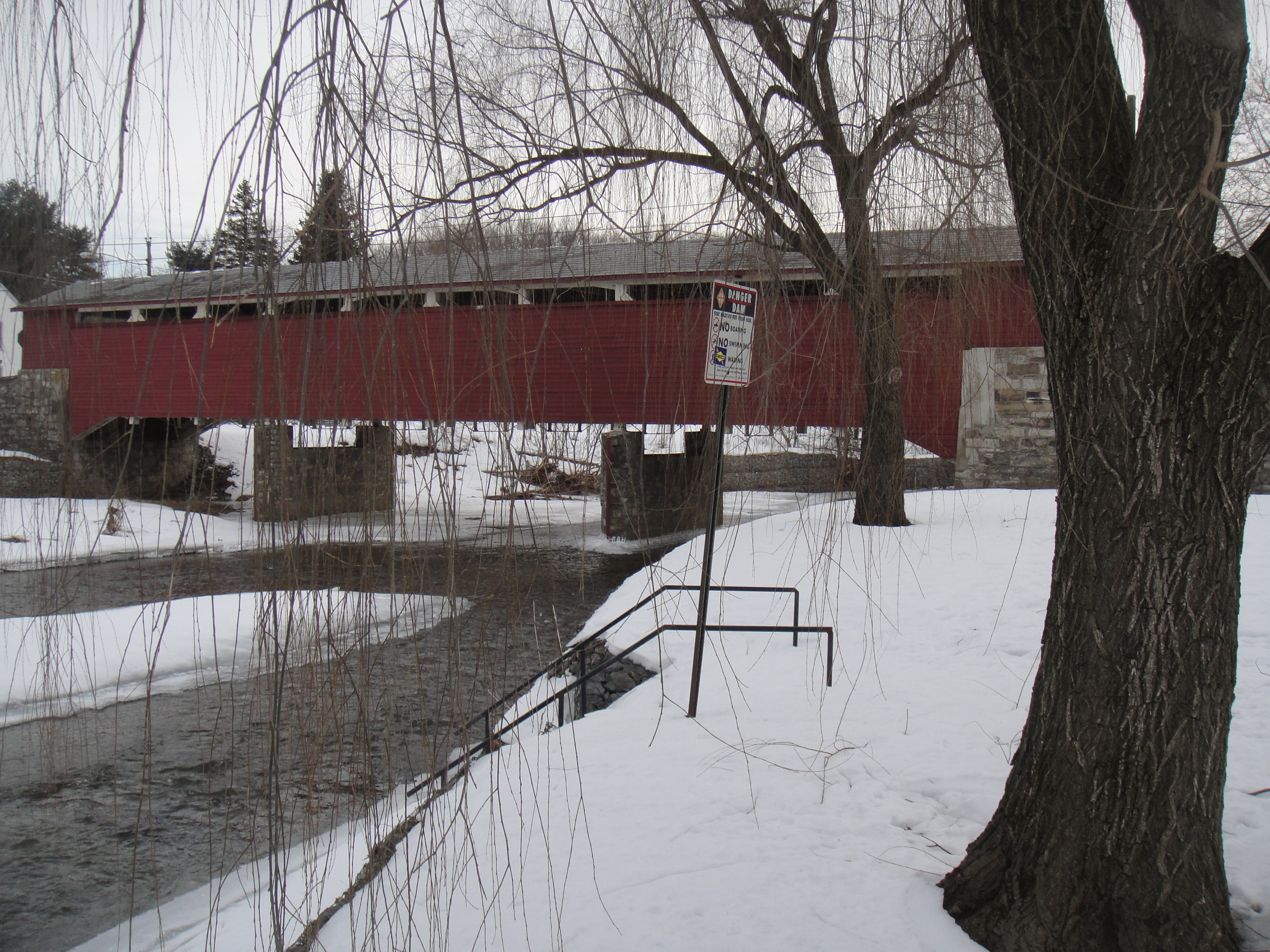

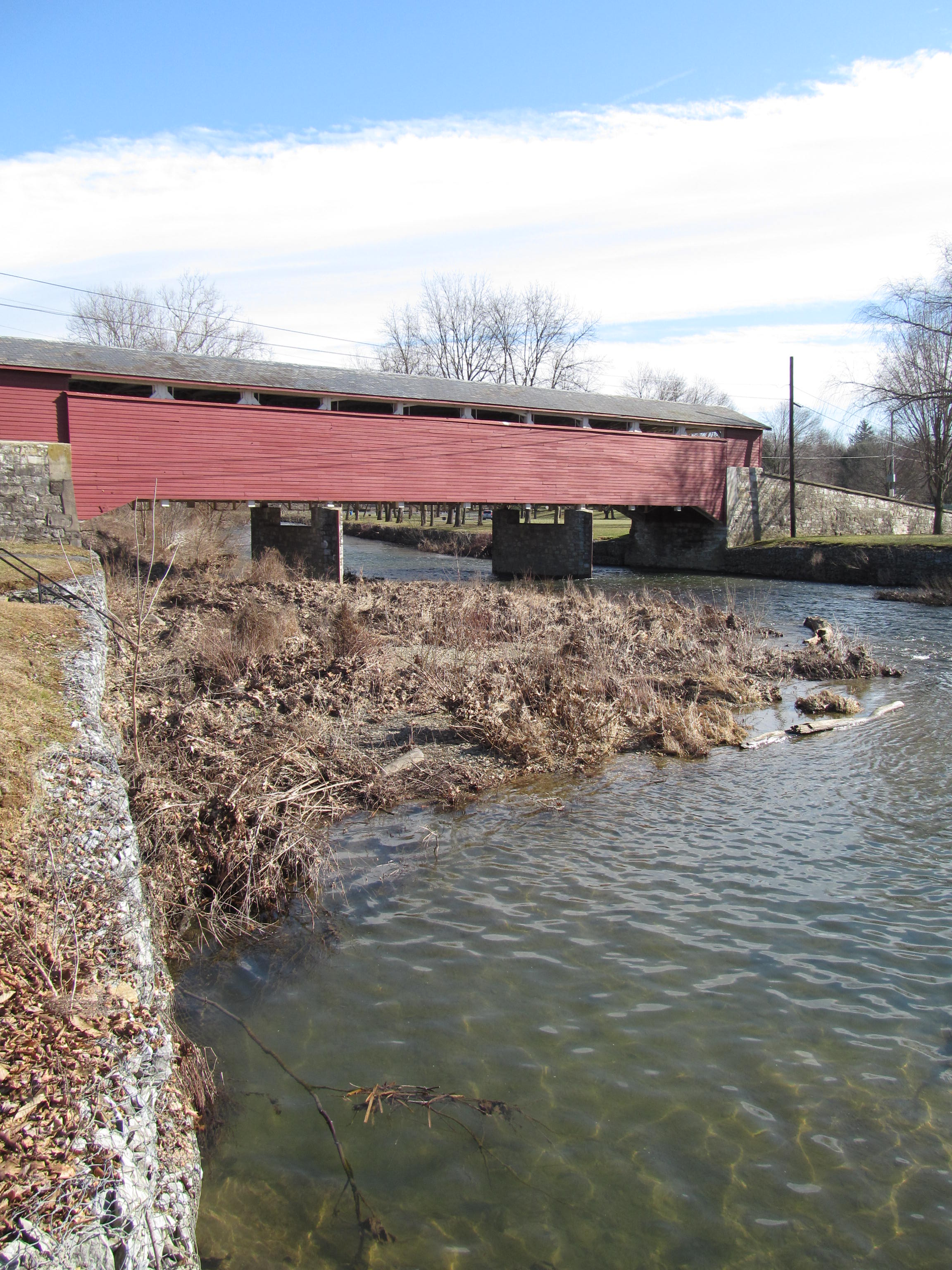

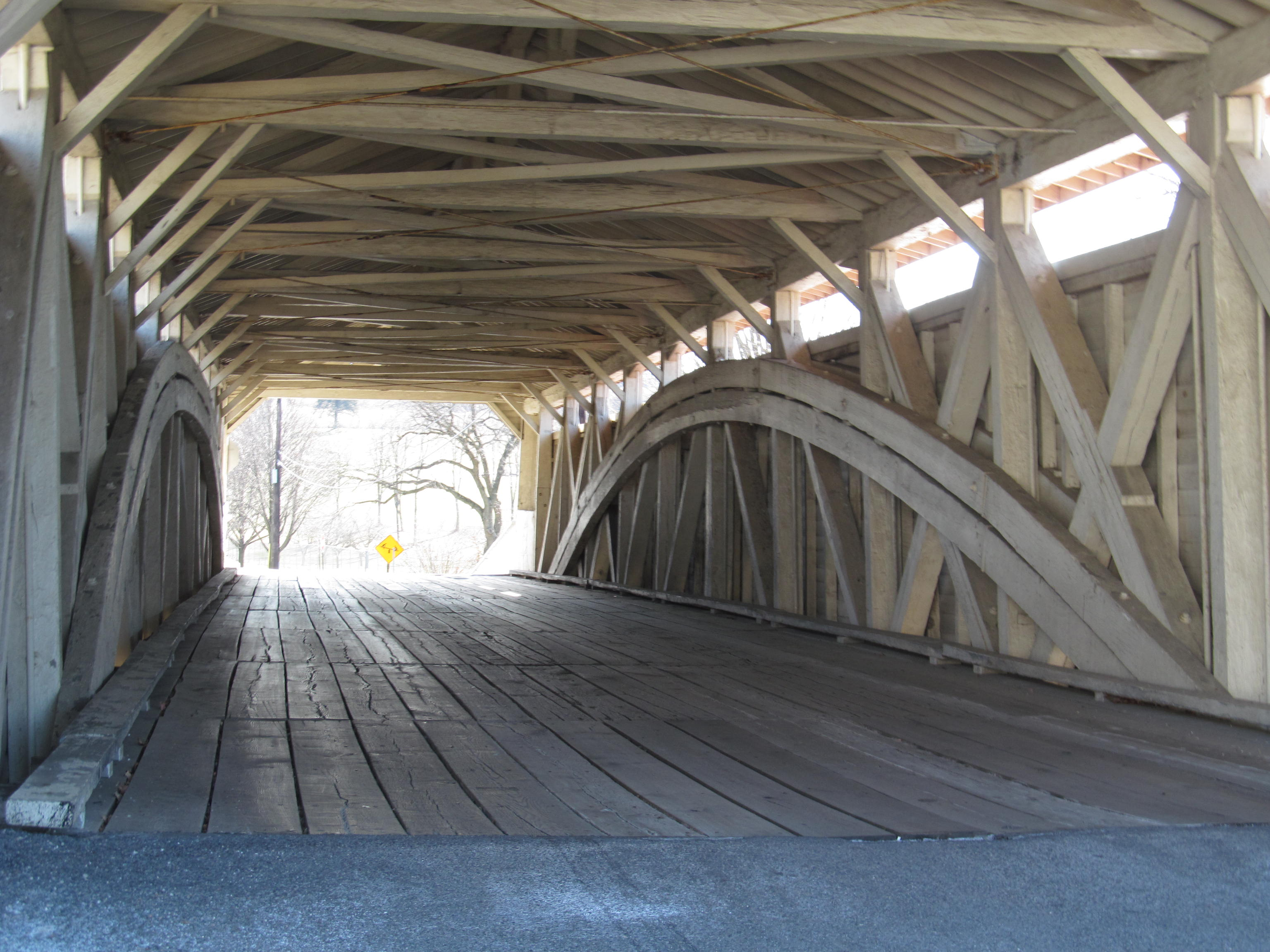

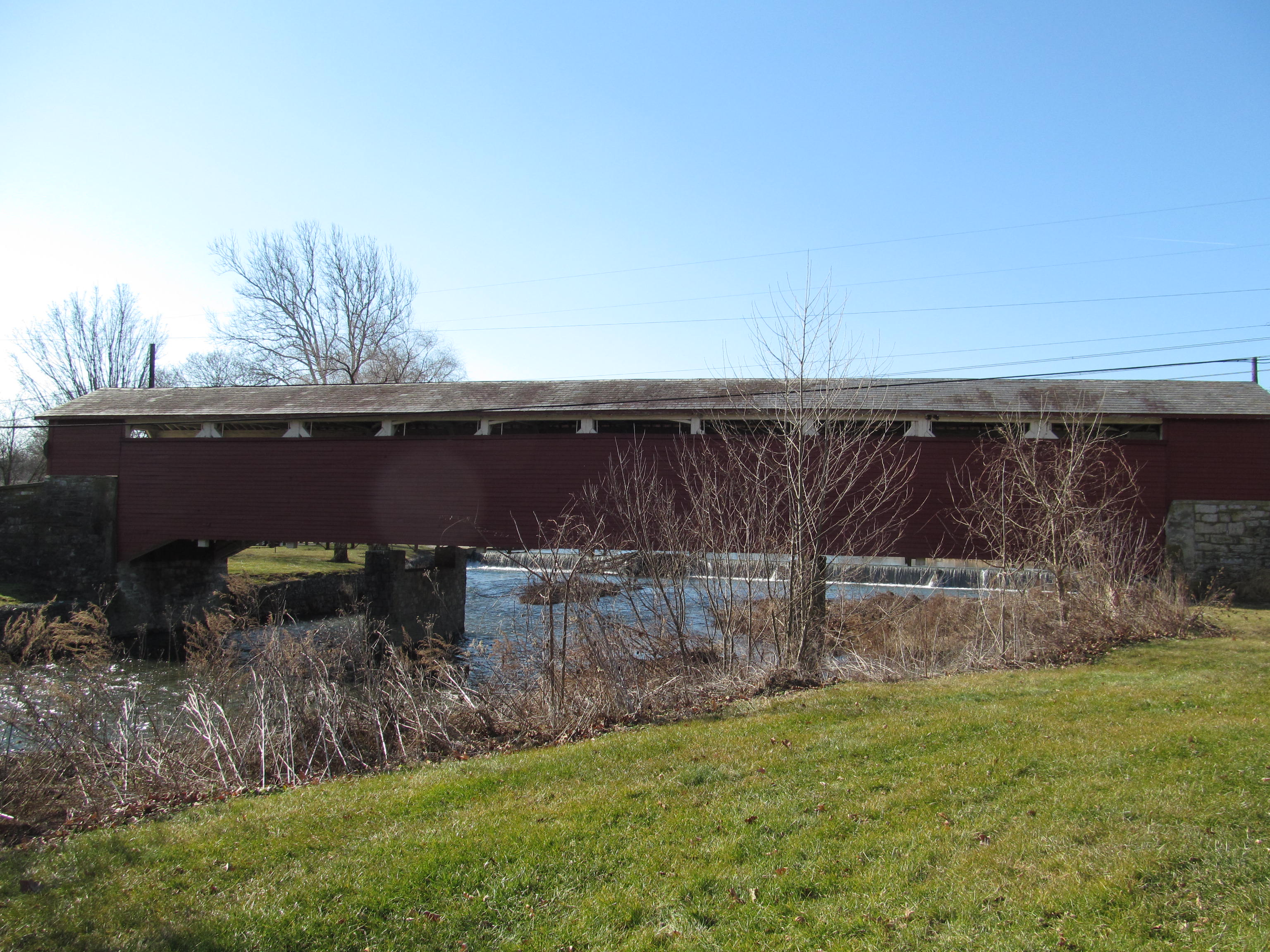

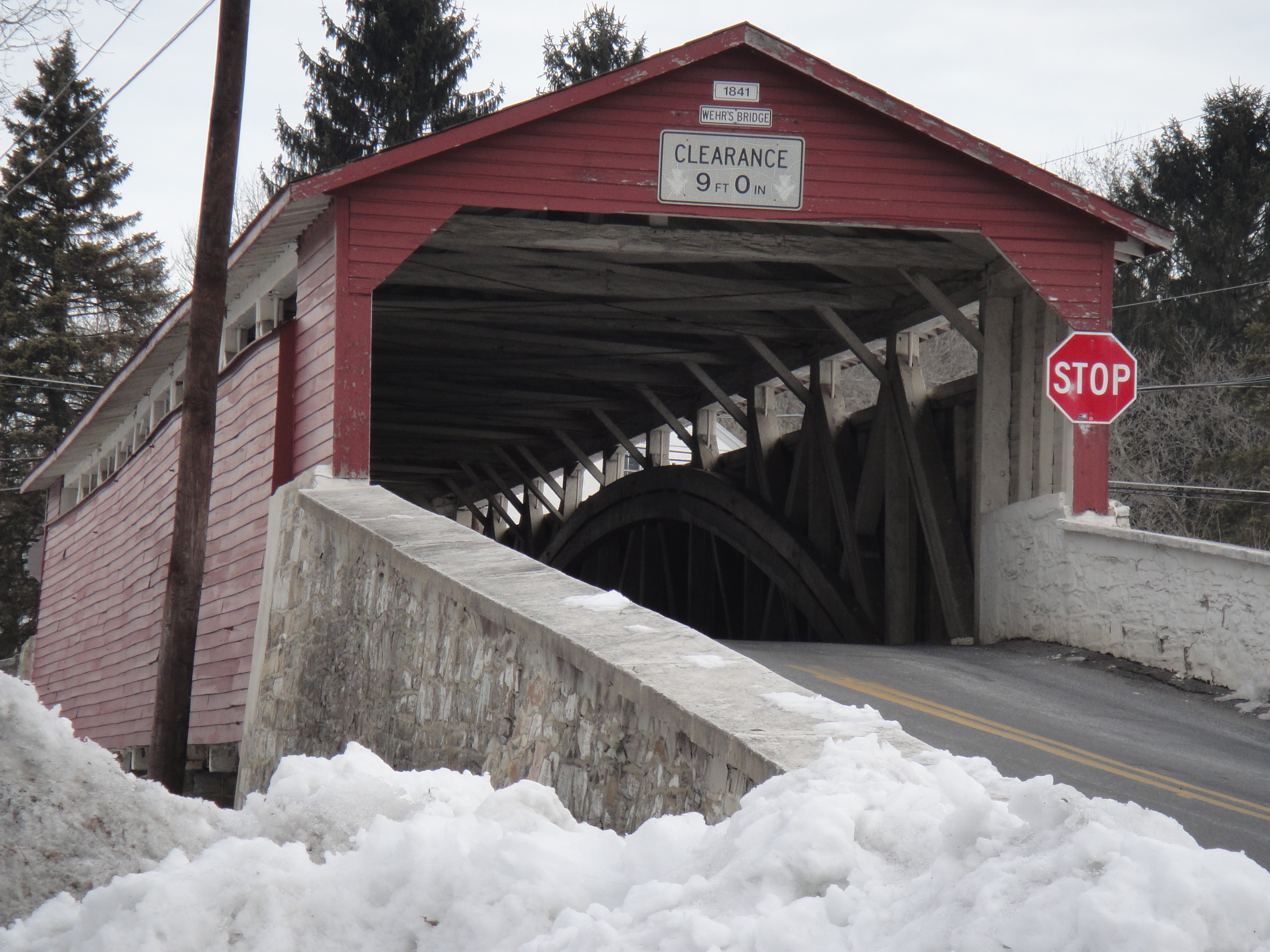
