= Haines Mill =

- U.S. National Register of Historic Places
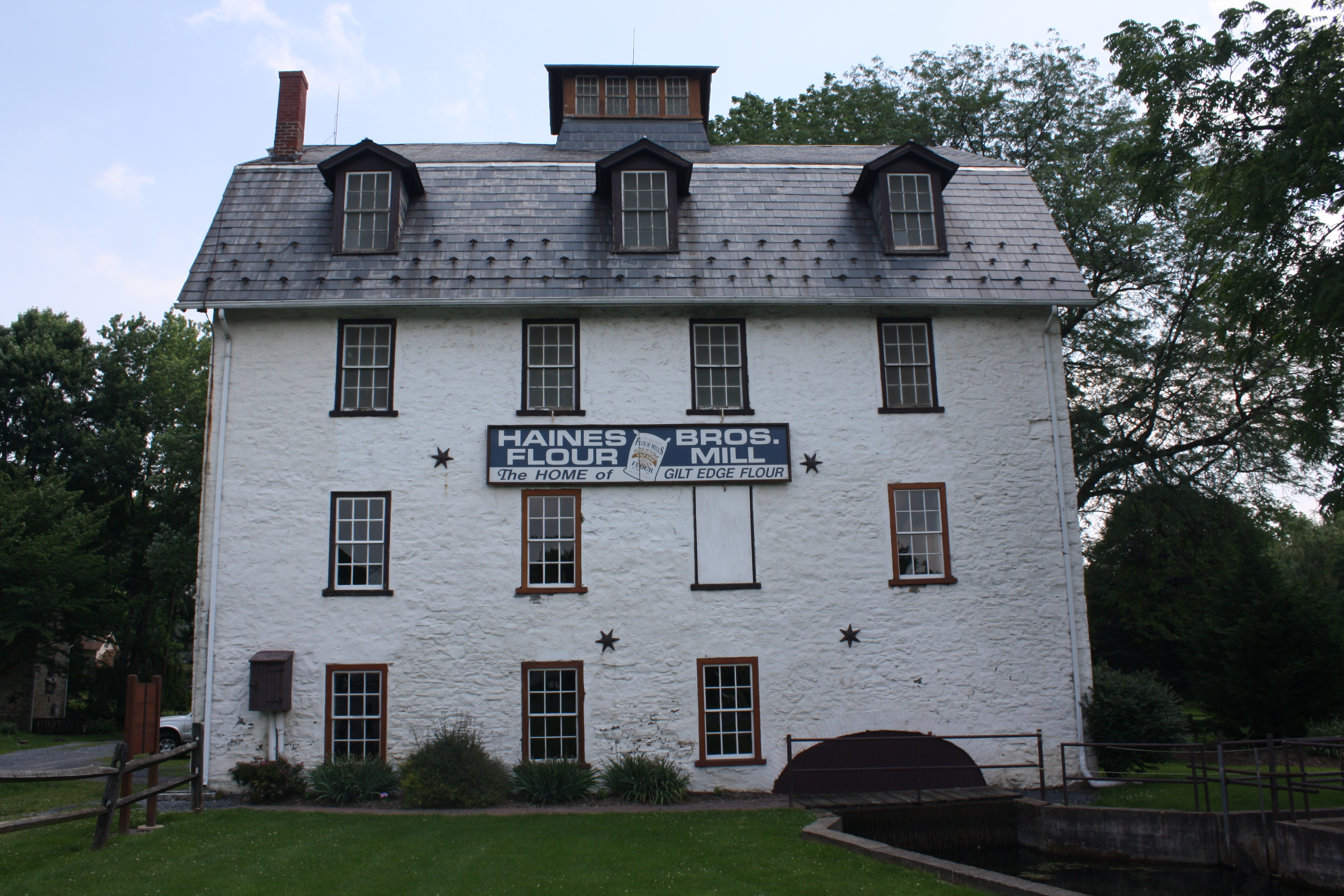
- Haines Mill in June 2013

- Location within Pennsylvania Location within the United States
- Location: Walnut St. and Main Blvd., South Whitehall Township, Pennsylvania, U.S.
- Coordinates: 40°35′6″N 75°31′56″W
- Area: 0.4 acres (0.16 ha)
- Built: c. 1840, 1908
- NRHP reference No.: 81000548
- Added to NRHP: September 11, 1981

Haines Mill, also known as the Haines Mill Museum, is an historic grist mill located in South Whitehall Township, Lehigh County, Pennsylvania. Built sometime around 1840, it is a four-story, stone building with a slate covered gambrel roof, and is three bays by three bays, 42 ft (13 m) by 46 ft 9 in (14.25 m).

== History and architectural features ==
The interior of this mill was rebuilt after a fire in 1908. A three-story brick addition was built in 1930, with a lean-to roof. A cupola sits atop the main roof. Haines Mill remained in full operation until 1957.

Haines Mill is operated as a partnership between Lehigh County, which owns and maintains the site, and the Lehigh County Historical Society, which provides public tours of it.

It was listed on the National Register of Historic Places in 1981.

== Gallery ==
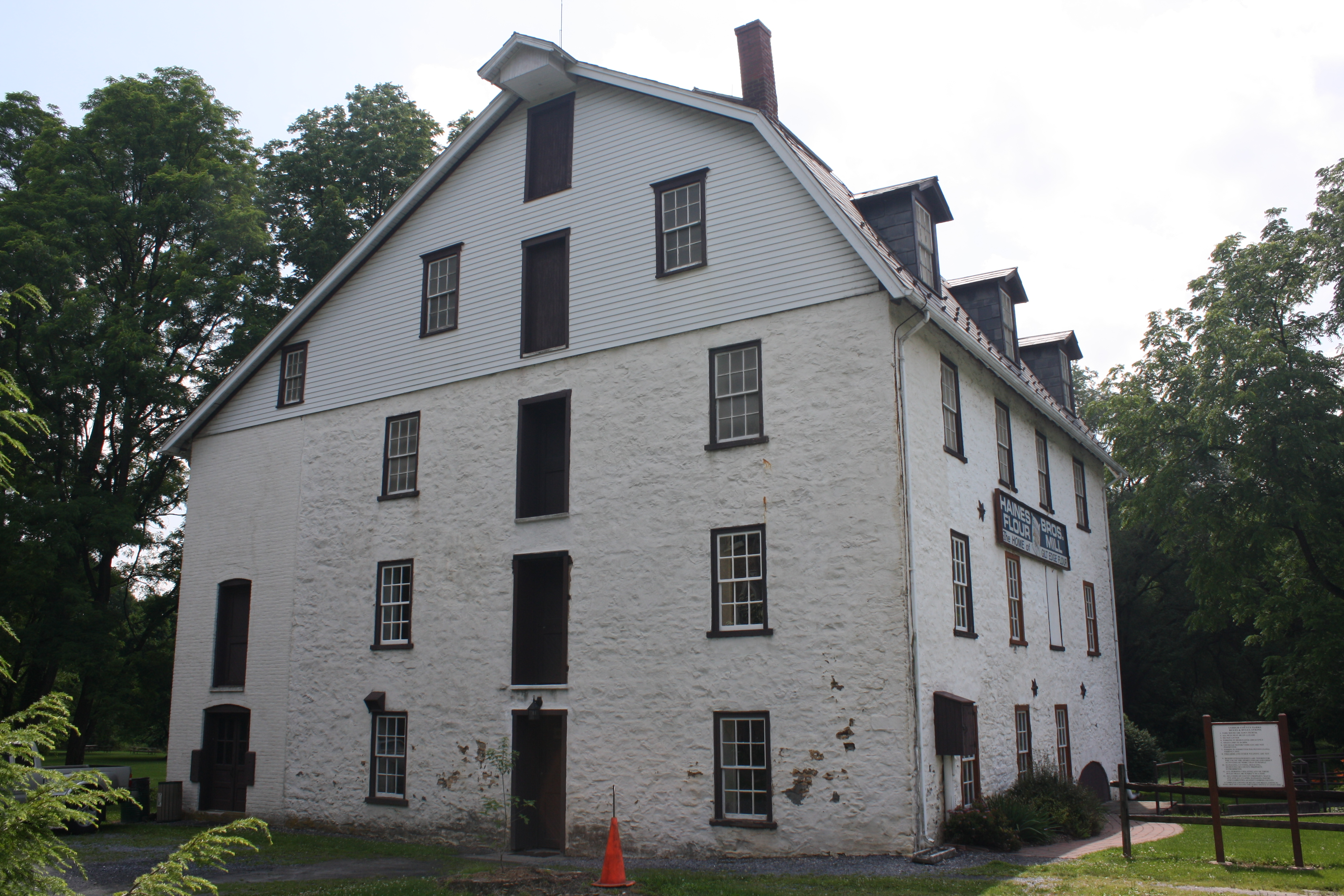

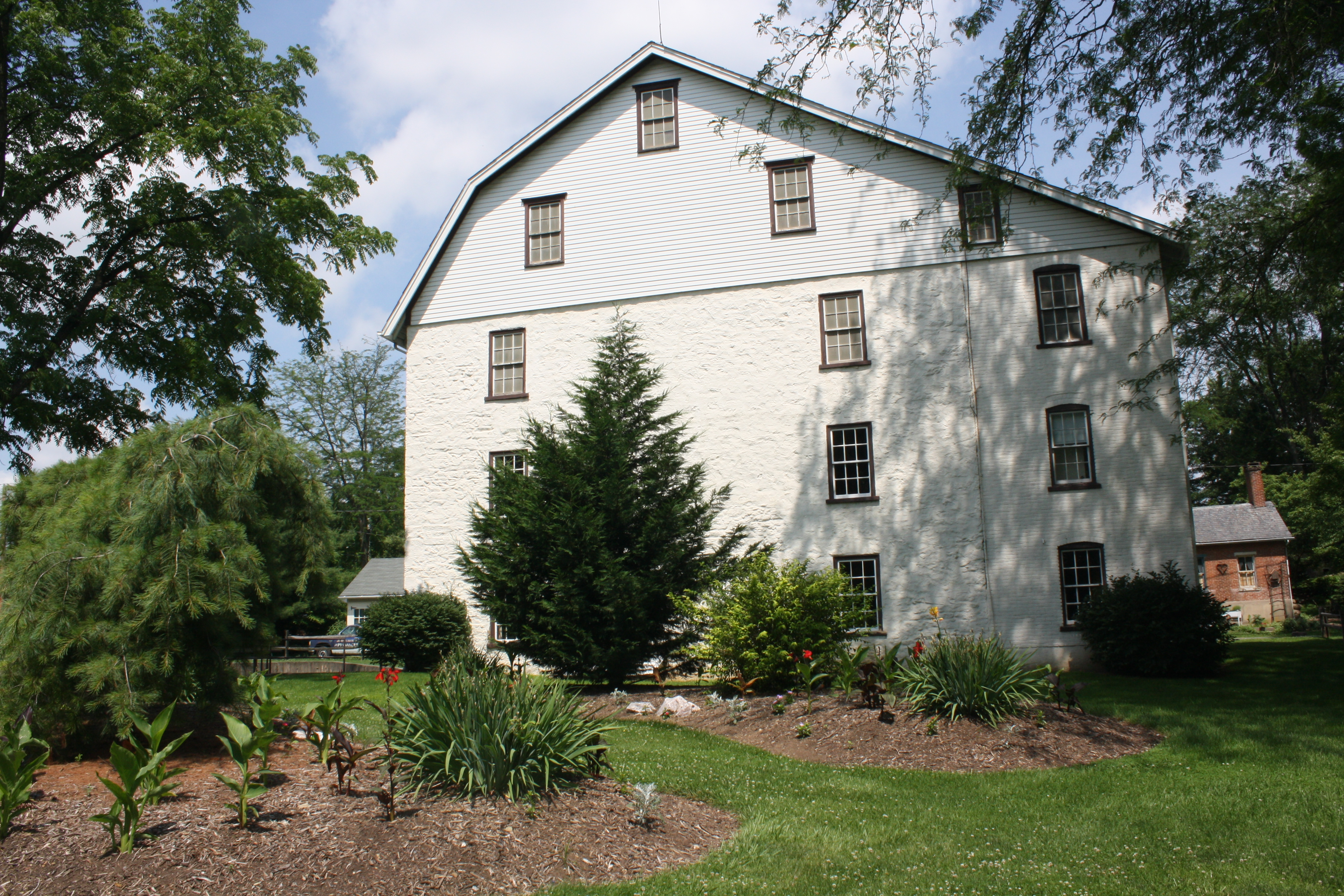

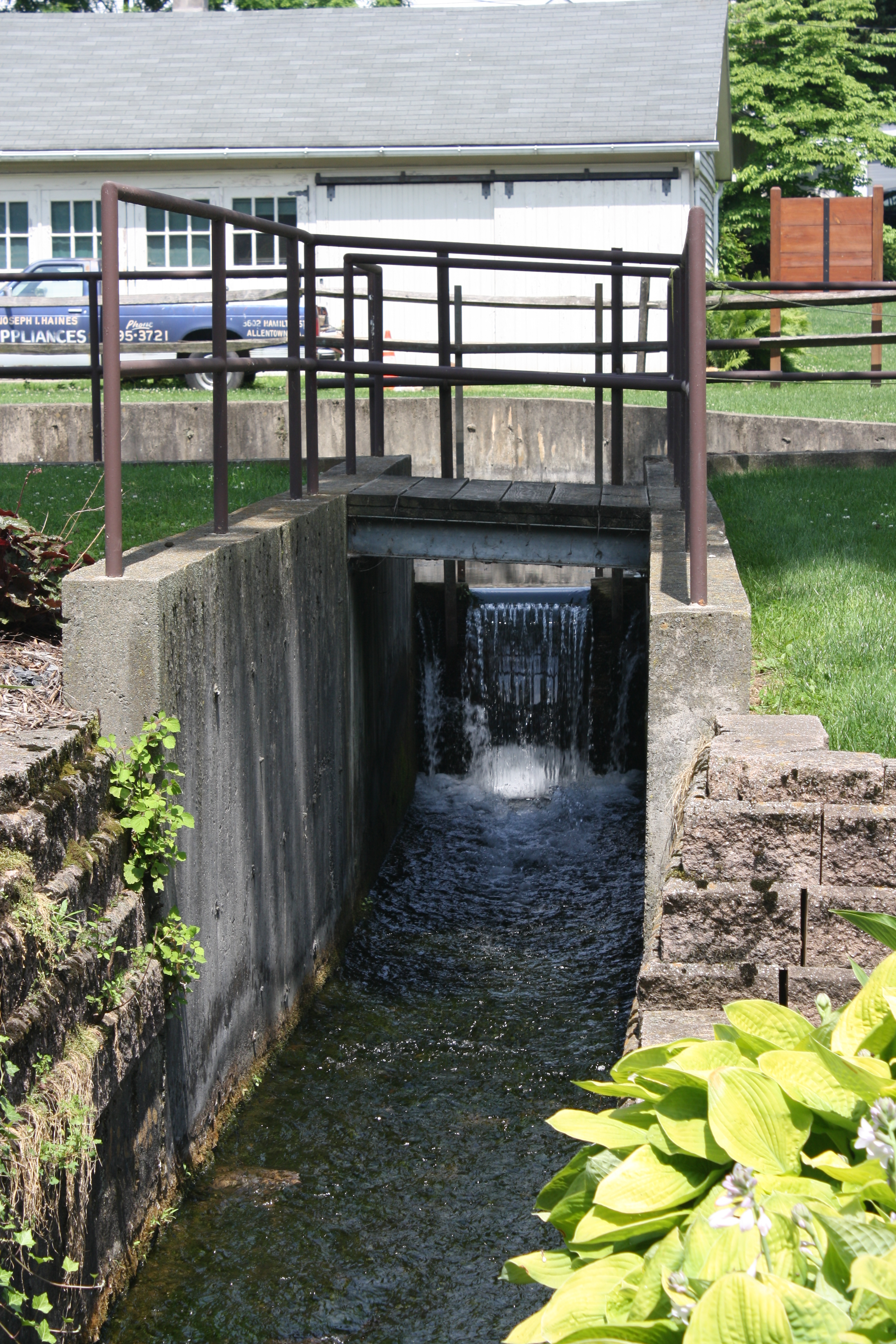

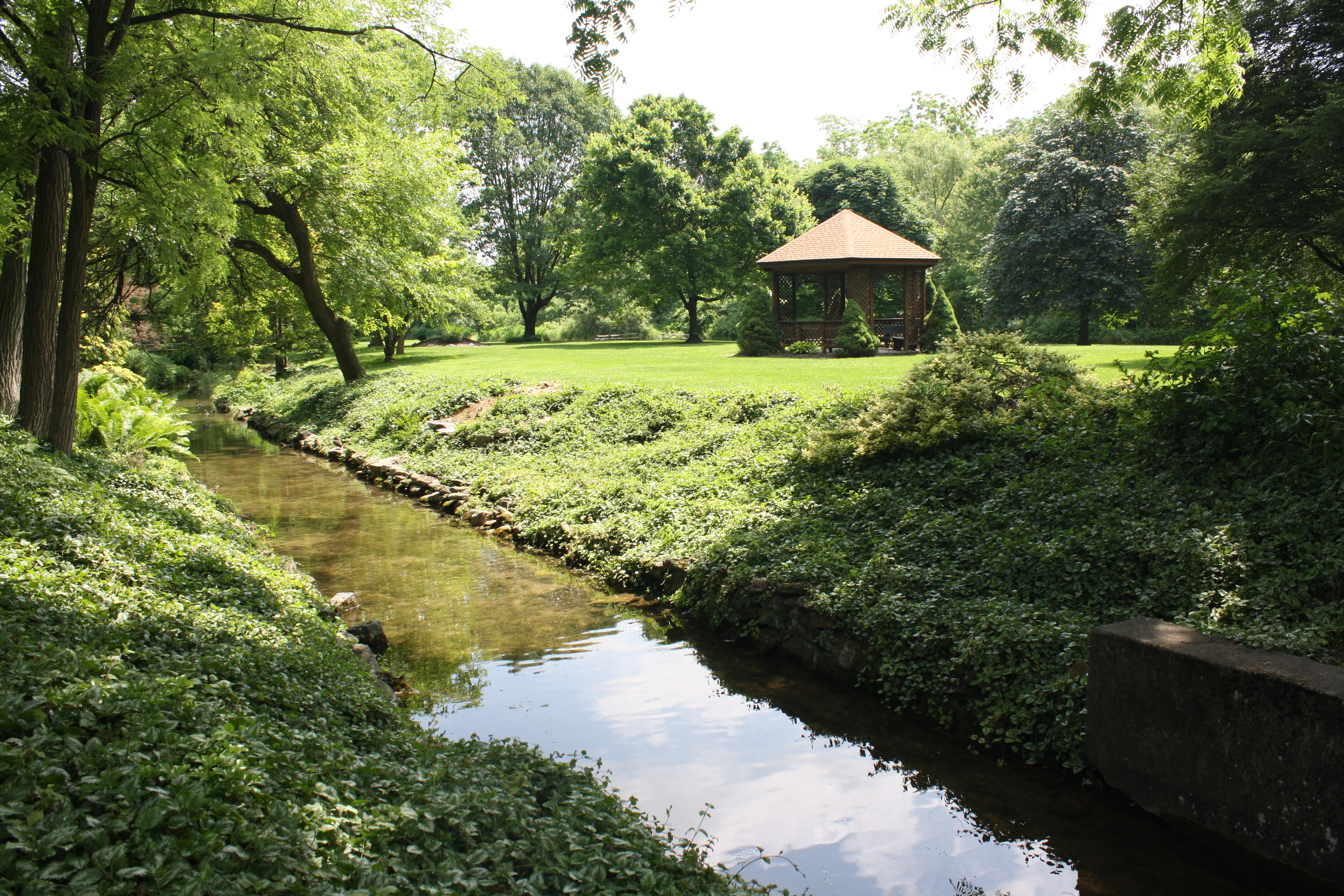

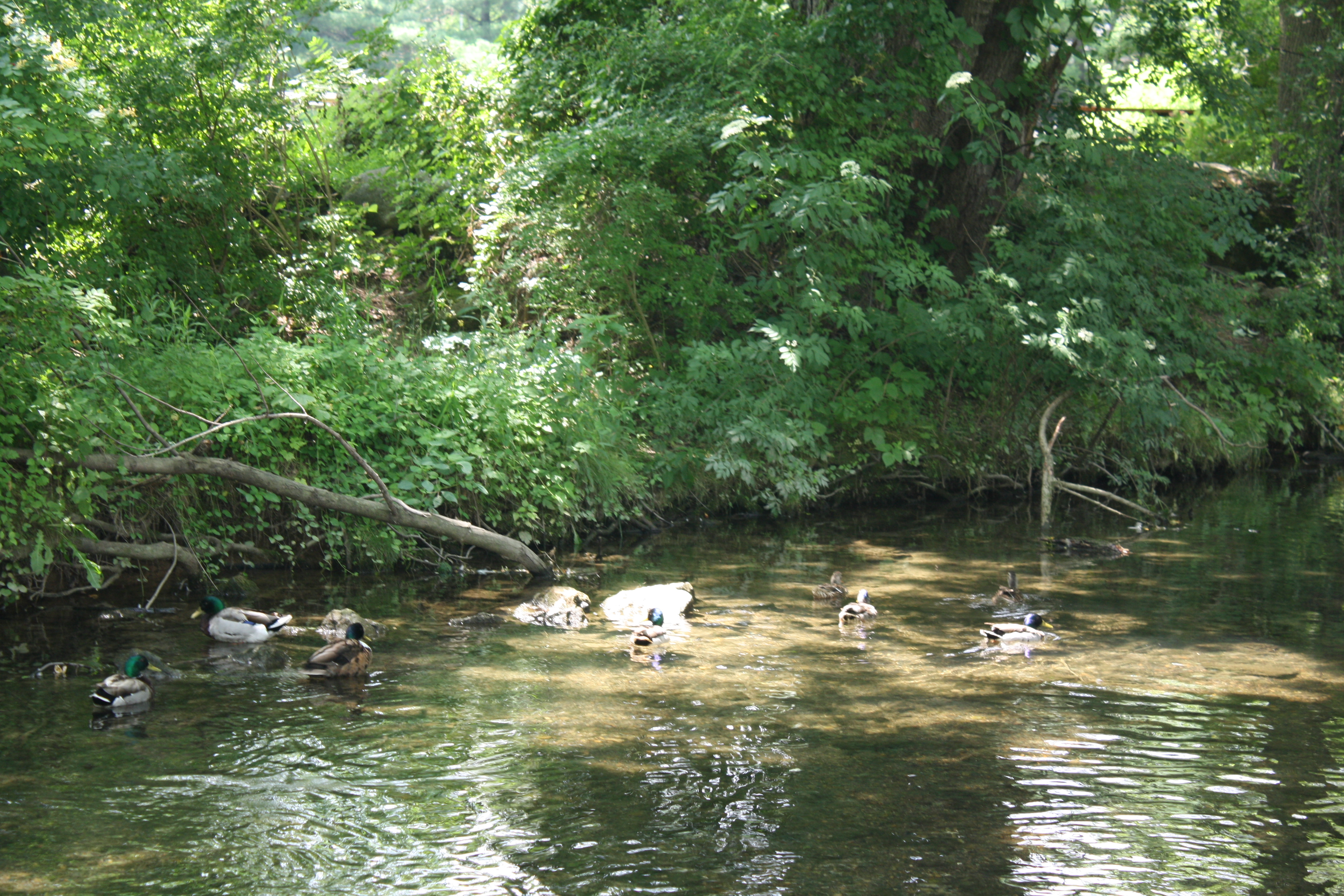
