= Sam Iorio =

American-Israeli basketball player (born 1998)

Sam Iorio סם איוריו
No. 22 – Hapoel Holon
- Position: Power forward / small forward
- League: Israeli Basketball Premier League

Personal information
- Born: August 31, 1998 (age 28) Allentown, Pennsylvania, U.S.
- Listed height: 6 ft 7 in (2.01 m)
- Listed weight: 228 lb (103 kg)

Career information
- High school: Parkland High School (Allentown, Pennsylvania)
- College: American University (2017–19); University of South Alabama (2020–21); Niagara University (2021–23)
- NBA draft: 2023: undrafted
- Playing career: 2023–present

Career history
- 2023–2026: Hapoel Be'er Sheva
- 2026–present: Hapoel Holon

Career highlights
- Patriot League All-Rookie Team (2018); Pennsylvania Class 6A Player of the Year (2017); 3× The Morning Call Player of the Year (2015–2017); lehighvalleylive Player of the Year (2017)
Medals
Representing United States
Basketball
Maccabiah Games
Gold medal – first place	2022 Israel	Basketball

Samuel Patrick Iorio (Hebrew: סם איוריו; born August 31, 1998) is an American-Israeli professional basketball player for Hapoel Holon of the Israeli Basketball Premier League. At Parkland High School in Allentown, Pennsylvania, where he graduated in 2017, he was the school's all-time leading career scorer. In college, he played for American University for two seasons, for the University of South Alabama for one season, and for Niagara University for two seasons. He won a gold medal with Team USA at the 2022 Maccabiah Games in Israel. In 2023, he signed a three-year contract with Hapoel Be'er Sheva.

== Early life and education ==
Iorio was born in Allentown, Pennsylvania, on August 31, 1998. His parents are Mike, a former basketball player at Philadelphia University, and Donna Iorio. His grandfather is former Villanova University basketball player Sam Iorio. At seven years of age, with his mother making the decision for him, he converted from Christianity to Judaism. In later years he had a bar mitzvah, and a tattoo on his left wrist with the inscription “Baruch Hashem,” which translates from Hebrew to "Blessed Is The Name", his mother's favorite saying. In 2022, he said, "If you would’ve told me when I was seven years old, where converting to Judaism would take me, I would have never believed you. It’s just been one of the biggest blessings of my life, and I owe my mom a lot of credit for having the faith and courage to do that." American-born, he also obtained dual Israeli citizenship.

Iorio attended Parkland High School in Allentown, playing guard and forward for its Trojans basketball team. He graduated in 2017 as the school's all-time leading career scorer with 1,892 points as he averaged 16.5 points and 6.5 rebounds per game. He was named Class 6A Player of the Year and First Team All-Pennsylvania, and was named Player of the Year in both 2015 and 2016 by The Morning Call.

He is 6 ft 7 in (201 cm) tall, and weighs 228 pounds (103 kg).

== College ==
Iorio attended three different colleges in seven years, playing parts of six different college seasons, and scoring 1,459 career points.

=== American University ===
Iorio attended American University in Washington, D.C., where he played for the American Eagles men's basketball team for two seasons.

In 2017–18 in his freshman year, Iorio averaged 14.9 points (8th in the Patriot League), 6.5 rebounds (5th), 0.9 blocks (5th), and 1.4 steals (9th) per game, as he shot 47.7% from the floor (7th) and 43.7% from three point range. He was named to the Patriot League All-Rookie Team.

In 2018–19 in his sophomore year, he started 27 games and averaged 13.3 points, 6.5 rebounds (5th in the Patriot League), and 0.9 blocks (8th) per game, as Iorio shot 80.3% from the free throw line.

=== South Alabama ===
Iorio transferred to the University of South Alabama in Mobile, Alabama, where he played for the South Alabama Jaguars basketball team in the Sun Belt Conference from 2019 to 2021. He did not play in 2019–20, sitting out his first year at the school to comply with NCAA transfer rules.

In 2020–21, he played in 25 games (11 starts) and averaged 7.6 points and 3.8 rebounds per game, as Iorio shot 80.6% from the free throw line.

=== Niagara University ===
From 2021 to 2023, Iorio started 55 of 60 games playing for Niagara University's Purple Eagles basketball team in Lewiston, New York, which competes in the Metro Atlantic Athletic Conference. He started immediately for the team as a graduate transfer as he studied for his MBA.

In 2021–22, as a graduate student at Niagara University, he played in 30 games (25 starts), and averaged 8.4 points, 6.1 rebounds, and 0.8 blocks (7th in the conference) per game.

In 2022–23, Iorio played in 30 games (25 starts), and averaged 8.0 points and 5.5 rebounds per game. He graduated from Niagara University in 2023.

== Maccabiah Games ==
In 2019, Iorio played for Team USA in the 2019 European Maccabi Games in Budapest, Hungary, and the team won the gold medal, defeating Team Russia in the final.

Three years later, Iorio won a gold medal as part of Team USA's men's basketball team at the 2022 Maccabiah Games in Israel, defeating Team France in the final. His head coach was Doug Gottlieb. He played in all six games during the tournament and averaged 5.5 points and 3.8 rebounds per game.

== Professional career ==
=== Hapoel Be'er Sheva (2023–2026) ===
In July 2023, Iorio signed a three-year contract with, and he now plays forward for, Hapoel Be'er Sheva of the Israeli Basketball Premier League. His jersey was number 22.

In 2023-24 he played 15 games and averaged 2.1 points, 2.3 rebounds, 0.8 assists, and 11.1 minutes per game. In 2024-25 he played 25 games and averaged 4.1 points, 3.0 rebounds, 1.3 assists, and 17.3 minutes per game.

In 2025-26 he played 29 games and averaged 5.4 points, 3.9 rebounds, 1.8 assists, and 20.0 minutes per game.

=== Hapoel Holon (2026–present) ===
He is playing for Hapoel Holon in the Israeli Basketball Premier League in the 2026–27 season.

== Career statistics ==
Legend
GP	Games played	GS	Games started	MPG	Minutes per game
FG%	Field goal percentage	3P%	3-point field goal percentage	FT%	Free throw percentage
RPG	Rebounds per game	APG	Assists per game	SPG	Steals per game
BPG	Blocks per game	PPG	Points per game	**Bold**	Career high

=== College ===
Year	Team	GP	GS	MPG	FG%	3P%	FT%	RPG	APG	SPG	BPG	PPG
2017–18	American	28	28	33.4	**.477**	**.437**	.791	**6.5**	1.3	**1.4**	**.9**	**14.9**
2018–19	American	27	27	**37.3**	.421	.348	**.821**	**6.5**	**2.0**	1.0	**.9**	13.3
2019–20	South Alabama	Transfer										
2020–21	South Alabama	25	11	23.4	.412	.329	.806	3.8	1.0	.6	.6	7.6
2021–22	Niagara	**30**	25	25.2	.407	.270	.684	6.1	1.0	.8	.8	8.4
2022–23	Niagara	**30**	**30**	26.5	.476	.360	.770	5.5	1.3	.7	.6	8.0
Career		140	121	29.1	.440	.357	.773	5.7	1.3	.9	.8	10.4
