= Dorneyville Crossroad Settlement =

- U.S. National Register of Historic Places
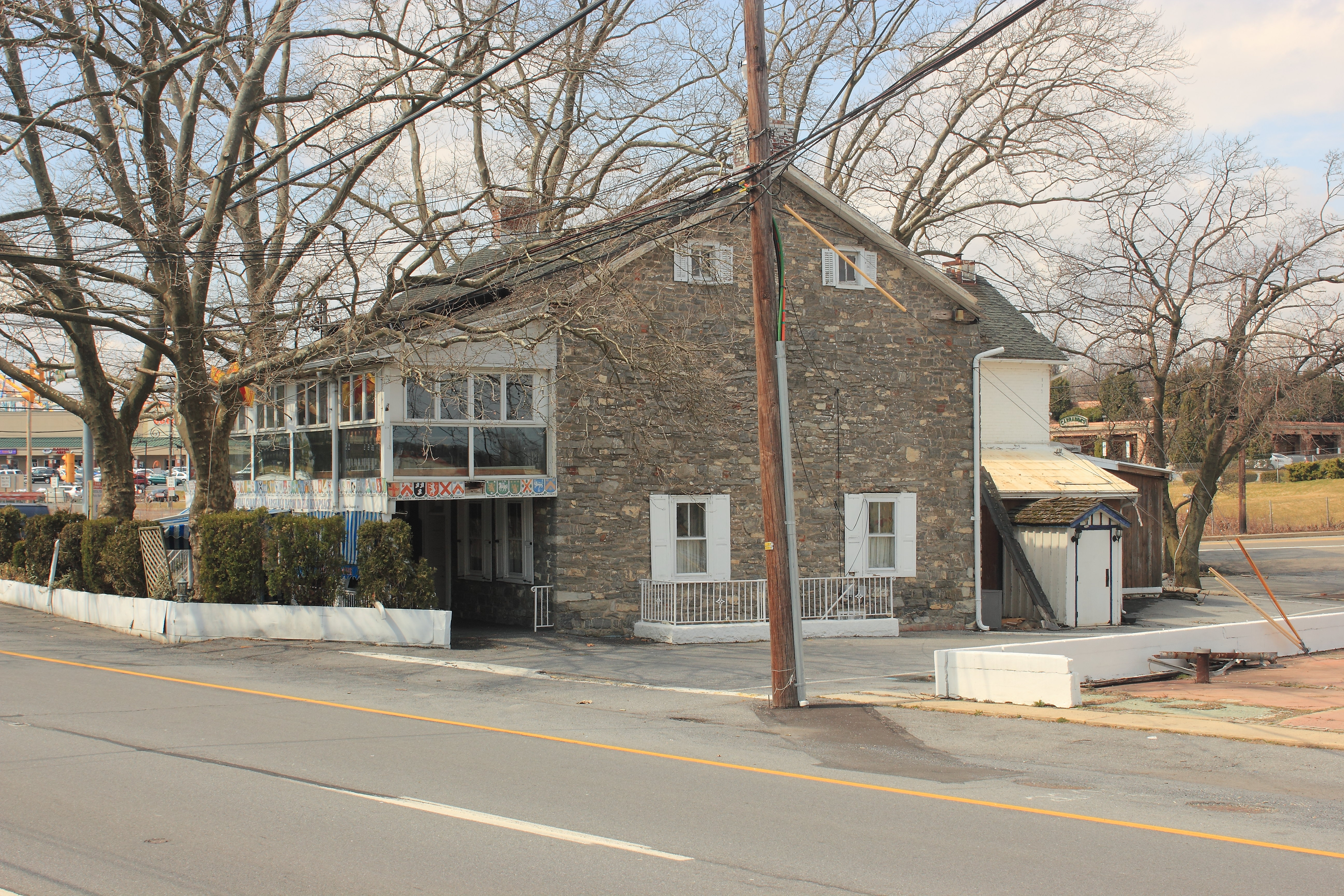
- King George Inn in South Whitehall Township, Pennsylvania in April 2013

- Location within Pennsylvania Location within the United States
- Location: South of Allentown at the junction of U.S. Route 222 and PA Route 29, South Whitehall Township, Pennsylvania, U.S.
- Coordinates: 40°34′48″N 75°31′19″W
- Area: 3 acres (1.2 ha)
- Built: c. 1755
- Architectural style: Colonial, Georgian
- NRHP reference No.: 77001172
- Added to NRHP: December 7, 1977

Dorneyville Crossroad Settlement is a complex of three historic buildings, which are located in the Dorneyville section of South Whitehall Township in Lehigh County, Pennsylvania. The complex's three buildings include King George Inn, John Dorney House, and William Dorney House.

== History ==
The King George Inn is a large stone building that was erected in four sections. The oldest dates to roughly 1755, with additions made circa 1790, 1796 and 1930. It was operated as an inn and tavern.

The John Dorney House and William Dorney House are two stone dwellings that were built sometime around 1832 and 1835, respectively. They are representative of the Georgian style.

The complex was listed on the National Register of Historic Places in 1977.

King George Inn, which operated as a tavern and restaurant since 1756, closed unexpectedly in August 2012. It is scheduled for demolition.
