= Pasta Louise =

Pasta restaurant in Brooklyn, New York

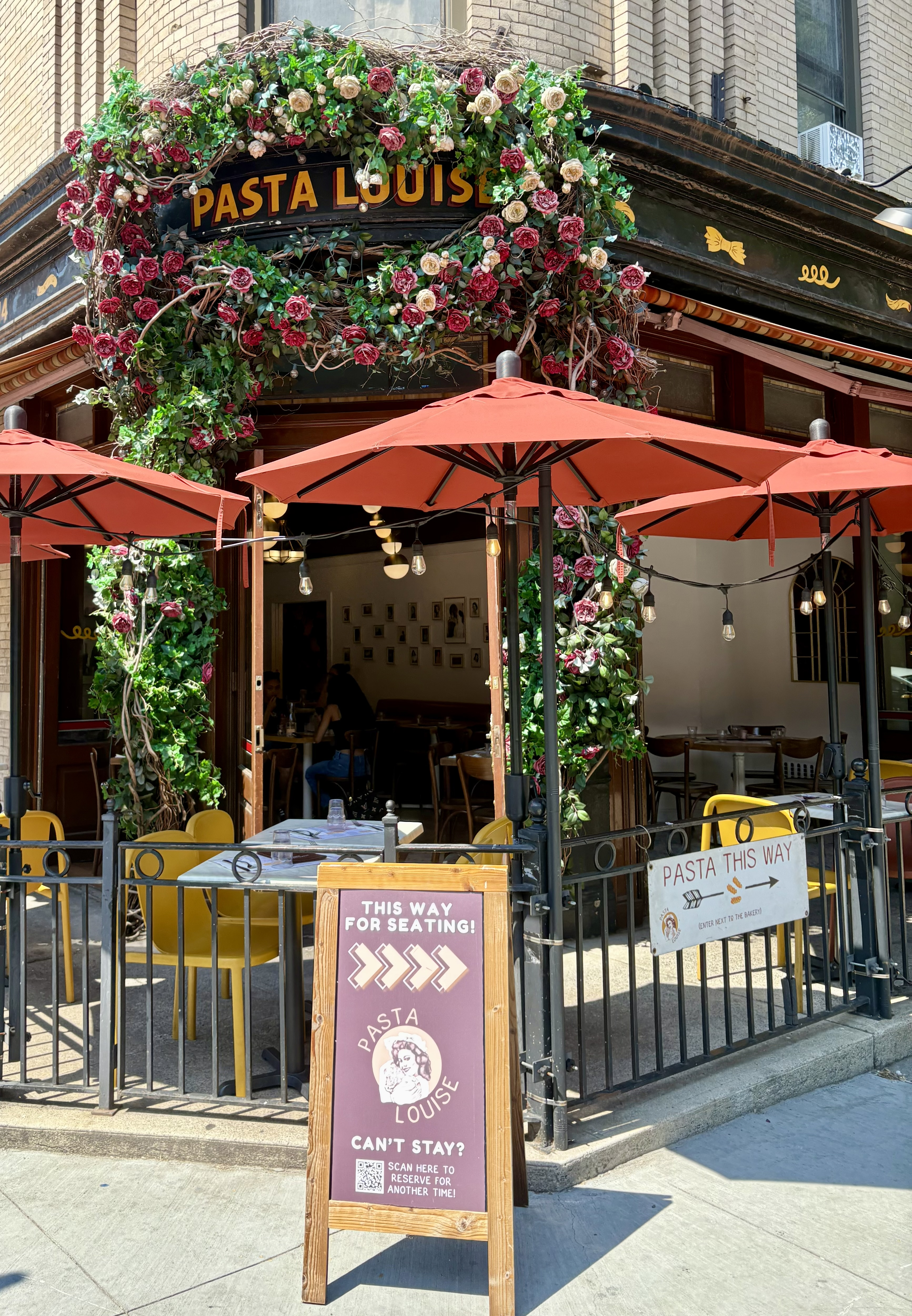

Restaurant information
- Established: 2020
- Owner: Allison Arevalo
- Food type: Italian
- Location: Park Slope, Brooklyn

Pasta Louise is a pasta-focused restaurant in the Park Slope neighborhood of Brooklyn, New York City, opened by owner Allison Arevalo in 2020. The restaurant’s name references Arevalo’s middle name and honors her grandmother, Louise. Pasta Louise serves a single pasta shape that changes daily; diners choose sauces and toppings.

== History ==
Arevalo launched Pasta Louise during the COVID-19 pandemic, initially selling pasta from her stoop before opening the restaurant in 2020. In December 2021, Eater New York reported that the business planned an expansion to a larger corner space at Eighth Avenue and 12th Street. The full-service restaurant on 12th Street opened in May 2022, while the original Eighth Street location became Pasta Louise Cafe. In 2024, the team opened Bar Louise, a sister cocktail bar at 221 Seventh Avenue, with a menu focused on cocktails, wine, and small plates. Arevalo previously co-founded Homeroom, a mac and cheese restaurant in Oakland, California.

== Locations ==
Pasta Louise operates three venues in Park Slope:

- Pasta Louise Cafe – 803 Eighth Avenue (counter service, takeout, and retail).
- Pasta Louise Restaurant – 1114 Eighth Avenue at 12th Street (full-service dining).
- Bar Louise – 221 Seventh Avenue (cocktails, wine, and small plates).

== Community involvement ==
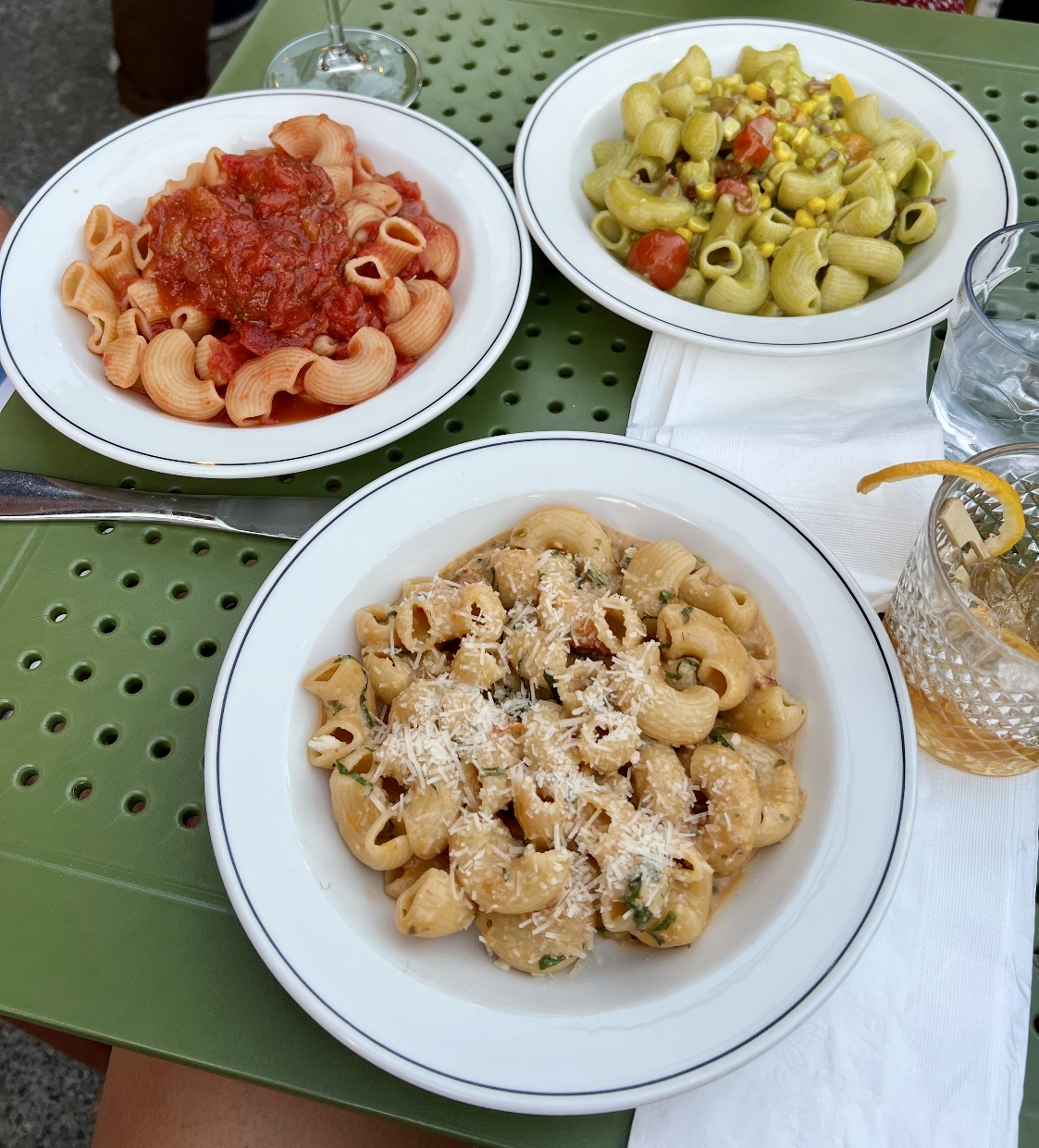
Three pasta dishes from Pasta Louise

Pasta Louise runs the Pasta Rose Scholarship, a yearly scholarship for Brooklyn high-school students who have lost a parent to cancer; the restaurant publishes winners and award amounts on its site. The scholarship is named for Arevalo’s nieces, Jasmine Rose and Scarlet Rose, and commemorates her sister, Lenore, who died of cancer in 2018.

== Reception and controversies ==
Reviewers have praised the restaurant’s house-made pasta and family-friendly atmosphere.

In April 2024, local television coverage described Bar Louise’s "adults-only" policy and the discussion it prompted in Park Slope. In May 2024, Appetito reported on online speculation that Pasta Louise had a role in the closure of a long-running neighborhood bakery and noted that the restaurant denied any involvement on its Instagram account.
