= Just Bakery of Atlanta =

Nonprofit bakery in Atlanta, Georgia, US

Just Bakery of Atlanta, Inc.
- Company type: Nonprofit organization
- Industry: Baked goods
- Founder: Leah Lonsbury
- Headquarters: Atlanta, Georgia; United States

Just Bakery of Atlanta is a nonprofit bakery that partners with neighbors who resettled as refugees on paid job training, professional certification, and living wage work.

The bakery was founded in October 2017 by Leah Lonsbury. Just Bakery of Atlanta bakes in a commercial kitchen in Stone Mountain, sells for doorstep deliveries and neighborhood pick-ups through an online store, local churches, pop-ups up around the metro area, and farmer's markets.
