= Antoinette Maniatty =

American materials scientist

Antoinette M. Maniatty (born 1965) is an American mechanical engineer whose research involves the mechanical properties of materials and a professor and department chair in the Department of Mechanical, Aerospace and Nuclear Engineering at the Rensselaer Polytechnic Institute. She has studied elasticity, fatigue, and cracking in the aluminum alloys used in aircraft.

== Early life and education ==
Maniatty was born in 1965 in Cincinnati, and grew up in Allentown, Pennsylvania, where she went to Parkland High School. She attended Rensselaer Polytechnic Institute, where she majored in mechanical engineering, graduating summa cum laude in 1987.

She earned a master's degree in 1988 from the University of Minnesota, under the supervision of Nicholas Zabaras, and then attended Cornell University, where she earned a second master's degree in 1990, completing her Ph.D. in 1991. Her dissertation, Eulerian elasto-viscoplastic formulation for modeling steady-state deformations with strain-induced anisotropy, was supervised by Paul Dawson.

== Career ==
After a year as a visiting lecturer in South Africa at the University of Natal, she returned to the Rensselaer Polytechnic Institute as Clare Boothe Luce Assistant Professor in 1992. She was promoted to associate professor in 1998 and full professor in 2005. Serving as acting department head beginning in 2022, she was named the head of RPI's Department of Mechanical, Aerospace, and Nuclear Engineering in July of 2023.

== Recognition ==
Maniatty was named as an ASME Fellow in 2005.
