= Jan E. DuBois =

American judge (1931–2026)

Judge of the United States District Court for the Eastern District of Pennsylvania
- In office July 27, 1988 – April 15, 2002
- Appointed by: Ronald Reagan
- Preceded by: Clifford Scott Green
- Succeeded by: James Knoll Gardner

Senior Judge of the United States District Court for the Eastern District of Pennsylvania
- In office April 15, 2002 – May 10, 2026

Personal details
- Born: Jan Ely DuBois; January 17, 1931 Philadelphia, Pennsylvania, U.S.
- Died: May 10, 2026 (aged 95)
- Education: University of Pennsylvania (BS); Yale University (LLB)

Jan Ely DuBois (January 17, 1931 – May 10, 2026) was an American jurist who served as a United States district judge of the United States District Court for the Eastern District of Pennsylvania.

== Biography ==
A native of Philadelphia, DuBois graduated from the University of Pennsylvania in 1952 with a Bachelor of Science degree. From 1952 to 1954 he served in the United States Army. He received his Bachelor of Laws from Yale Law School in 1957. While at law school, he served as a clerk in the Civil Division of the United States Department of Justice in 1956. After graduation, he was a law clerk to Judge Harry Ellis Kalodner of the United States Court of Appeals for the Third Circuit from 1957 to 1958. From 1958 to 1988 he worked in private practice in Philadelphia.

=== Federal judicial service ===
DuBois was nominated by President Ronald Reagan on May 10, 1988, to a seat on the United States District Court for the Eastern District of Pennsylvania vacated by Judge Clifford Scott Green. He was confirmed by the United States Senate on July 26, 1988, and received commission on July 27, 1988. He assumed senior status on April 15, 2002, remaining in that role until his death.

DuBois died on May 10, 2026, at the age of 95.

== See also ==
- List of Jewish American jurists

== Sources ==
Legal offices
Preceded by Clifford Scott Green	Judge of the United States District Court for the Eastern District of Pennsylvania; 1988–2002	Succeeded by James Knoll Gardner
