= South Whitehall Township, Pennsylvania =

Township in Pennsylvania, US

South Whitehall Township
- Township
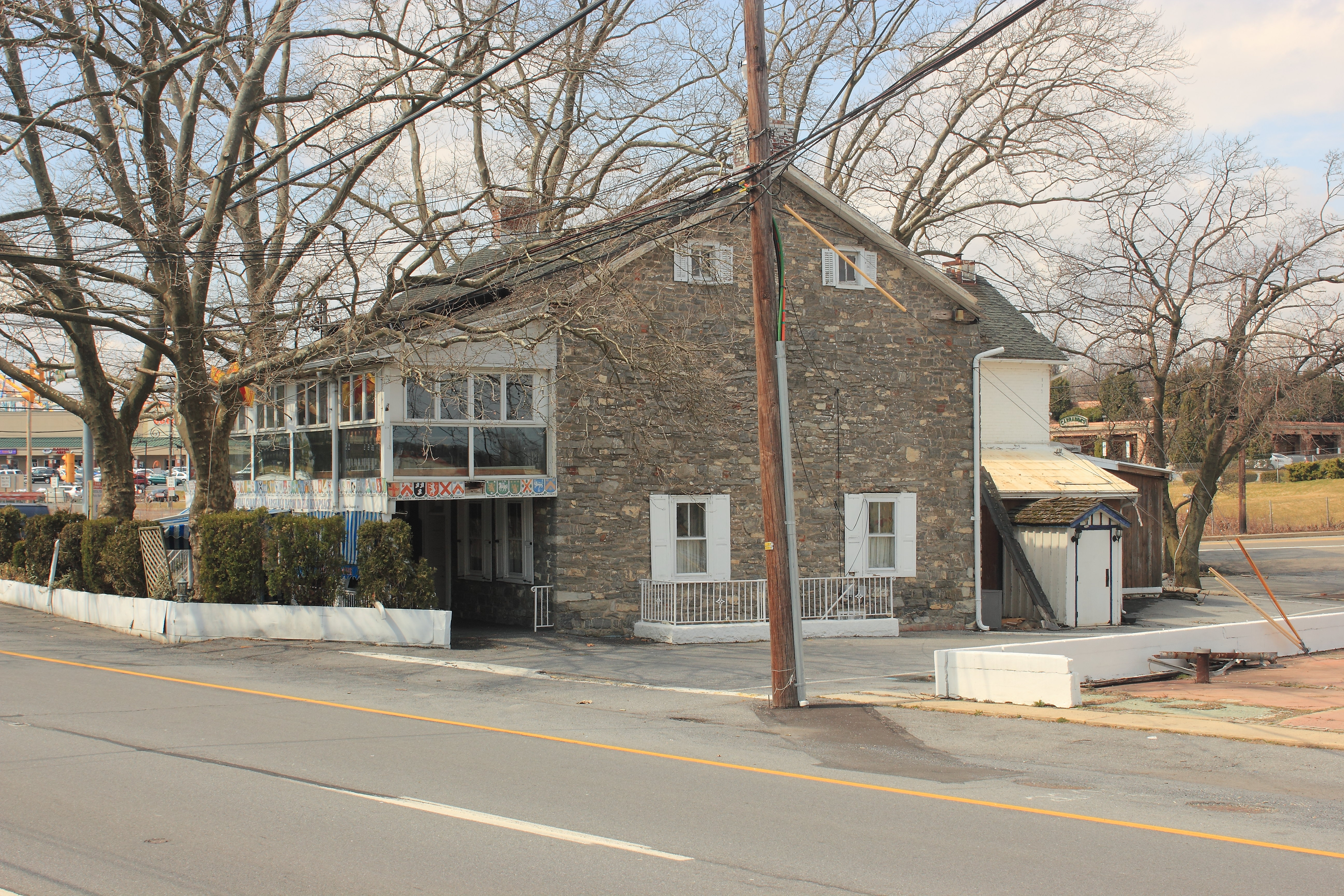
- Dorneyville Crossroad Settlement in South Whitehall Township in April 2013

- Logo

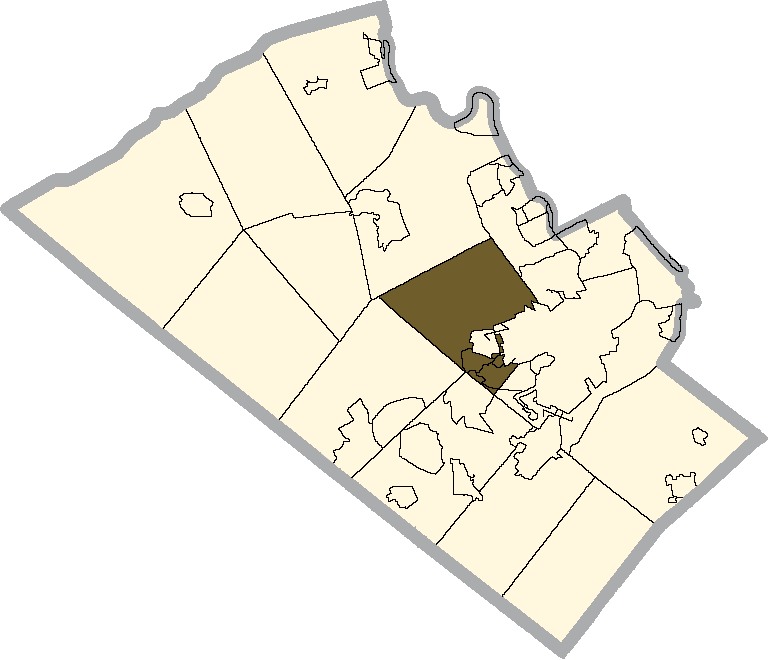
- Location of South Whitehall Township in Lehigh County, Pennsylvania

- Location of South Whitehall Township in Pennsylvania Location in the United States
- Coordinates: 40°36′56″N 75°33′01″W
- Country: United States
- State: Pennsylvania
- County: Lehigh
- Established: 1810

Area
  - Township: 17.25 sq mi (44.67 km^{2})
  - Land: 17.08 sq mi (44.23 km^{2})
  - Water: 0.17 sq mi (0.44 km^{2})
- Elevation: 443 ft (135 m)

Population (2010)
  - Township: 19,180
  - Estimate (2016): 19,794
  - Density: 1,159.1/sq mi (447.53/km^{2})
  - Metro: 865,310 (US: 68th)
- Time zone: UTC-5 (EST)
  - Summer (DST): UTC-4 (EDT)
- ZIP Codes: 18069, 18103, and 18104
- Area code: 610
- FIPS code: 42-077-72632
- Primary airport: Lehigh Valley International Airport
- Major hospital: Lehigh Valley Hospital–Cedar Crest
- School district: Parkland
- Website: southwhitehall.com

South Whitehall Township is a township in Lehigh County, Pennsylvania, United States. The township's population was 19,180 at the 2010 census. It is a suburb of Allentown and is part of the Lehigh Valley, which had a population of 861,899 and was the 68th-most populous metropolitan area in the U.S. as of the 2020 census.

South Whitehall Township borders Allentown to its east and is 59.3 miles (95.4 km) northwest of Philadelphia, and 94.5 miles (152.1 km) west of New York City. The Lehigh Valley interchange of the Northeast Extension of the Pennsylvania Turnpike and Dorney Park & Wildwater Kingdom are both located in the township.

== History ==
=== 18th century ===
The first settlers of the Lehigh Valley region were Germans, who emigrated from earlier settlements along Perkiomen Creek in present-day Lehigh and Montgomery counties. German settlers began arriving in present-day South Whitehall Township over a 20-year period beginning in about 1732. The immigration of the Germans and other European natives, including the Swiss and Huguenots, was aided by William Penn and his friends. The land lying south of South Mountain was given to William Penn in 1713 by the Lenape Native American tribe. The land of Lehigh County between Blue Mountain and Lehigh Mountain was granted to Penn's sons by the Lenape in 1732. European emigrants were drawn to the area because of its reputation for fertile land and its limestone flanking rivers and streams, including present-day Jordan Creek.

One of the earliest tracts of land purchased in the township was by Nicholas Kern, who bought property on December 3, 1735, and October 28, 1737. Some of this was sold to Lorenz Guth on February 27, 1739. Guth continued to buy land in the area of the Reformed Church property and also in the Guthsville area. By 1769, his holdings totaled 759 acres (3.07 km^{2}). The Lorenz Guth house near Wehr's Dam still stands in excellent condition and is an example of colonial architecture.

Much of the history of South Whitehall can be traced to the Walbert-Guthsville region, and especially the two Jordan churches. The first ministration to the Lutherans in the township occurred in 1734 when Reverend John Casper Stoever baptized Margaret, the daughter of the John Lichtenwalners, on February 6.

In 1736, a Reverend Schmidt preached occasionally to the Lutherans. In 1739, Reverend John Justus Jacob Birkenstock became pastor of the Jordan Lutheran congregation. In 1845, the centennial of the congregation was observed, suggesting that the first building was likely erected in 1745. The first church building was of logs and stood near the north wall of the old burial ground. It was used jointly by the Lutheran and Reformed congregations until about 1752 when the Reformed erected a building half a mile to the east, within sight of the current municipal building.

The original name "Whitehall" dates to 1740 and encompasses the land now found in North Whitehall, South Whitehall, and Whitehall townships. Prior to the establishment of Northampton County in 1752, the area was part of Bucks County, and the land currently occupied by South Whitehall was known as "the back part of Macungie" on the Heidelberg District. The name Whitehall is thought to be derived from one of two sources: either a place in England, or for a white house erected as a hunting lodge near Jordan and Cedar creeks.

The Lutherans built the present church in 1842–1843 at a cost of $3,581.24 (equivalent to $124,000 in 2025). It was renovated in 1868. In 1886, a fine, shapely, slate-covered steeple, 138 feet (42 m) high, was erected.

Members of the United Church of Christ religion settled in the area as early as 1738, and baptisms of their children during the period of 1740 to 1752 are recorded in the Lutheran record book. In 1752, Lorenz Guth presented the Reformed with a 50-acre (20 ha) tract of land, and a log church was erected in six weeks. The second and present church building, with its 110-foot (34 m) steeple, was built in 1808. It stands as one of the oldest church buildings in the country, and is a fine example of the architecture of that period.

The early schools of the township were connected with the two Jordan churches for many years, possibly extending back to 1739. According to the Roberts history, the congregations were at first supplied not by pastors, but by teachers who used to read sermons on Sundays. It is possible that church-sponsored schools taught by sermon readers existed in the earliest days of the congregations.

=== 19th century ===
South Whitehall Township was established in 1810 following a petition to the Northampton County Court to divide former Whitehall Township into two areas, North Whitehall and South Whitehall. In 1812, Lehigh County was divided off from the original Northampton County, establishing South Whitehall Township within and nearly at the center of Lehigh County. Agriculture was the backbone of the economy of the township for many years. Much of the land today still is under cultivation. For over a century, at least six grain mills flourished on Jordan and Cedar creeks.

In the early 19th century, iron ore was discovered at different places in the township, and mining operations were carried on from 1820 to 1890. In 1867, the eastern portion of South Whitehall and the southeastern portion of North Whitehall were detached and formed into Whitehall Township.

=== 20th century ===
In 1966, South Whitehall became a First Class Township. Four locations in the township, Dorneyville Crossroad Settlement, Haines Mill, Manasses Guth Covered Bridge, and Wehr Covered Bridge, have been listed with the National Register of Historic Places.

In January 2024, South Whitehall Township Police Department Chief Glen Dorney announced a full staff of 43 sworn police officers.

== Geography ==
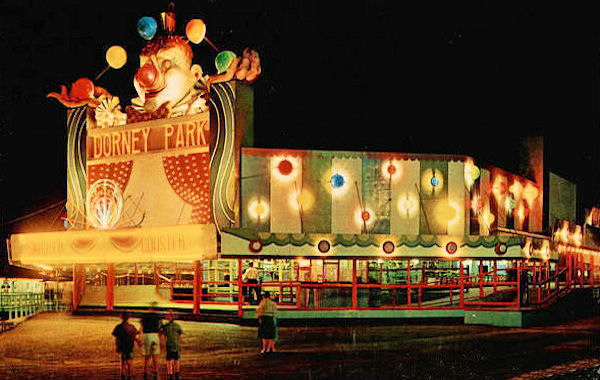
Main entrance to Dorney Park & Wildwater Kingdom in South Whitehall Township in 1950

According to the U.S. Census Bureau, the township has a total area of 17.3 square miles (44.7 km^{2}), of which 17.1 square miles (44.2 km^{2}) are land and 0.2 square miles (0.4 km^{2}), or 0.98%, are water. The township is located immediately west of Allentown and approximately 55 miles (89 km) northwest of Philadelphia. It is drained by Jordan Creek and Little Lehigh Creek into the Lehigh River.

South Whitehall has a hot-summer humid continental climate (Dfa) and is in hardiness zone 6b. Average monthly temperatures at Springhouse Middle School range from 28.6 °F (−1.9 °C) in January to 73.5 °F (23.1 °C) in July.

South Whitehall's villages include Cetronia, Crackersport, Dorneyville (also in Salisbury Township), Greenawalds, Guthsville, Mechanicsville (also in North Whitehall), Meyersville (also in North Whitehall), Orefield (also in North Whitehall), Parkway Manor, Scherersville (also in Whitehall Township), Sterlingworth, Walbert, Wennersville, Westwood Heights, and Woodlawn.

=== Adjacent municipalities ===
- Upper Macungie Township (southwest)
- Lower Macungie Township (south)
- Salisbury Township (south)
- Allentown (southeast)
- Whitehall Township (northeast)
- North Whitehall Township (north)
- Lowhill Township (tangent to the west)

== Demographics ==
Historical population
Census	Pop.	Note	%±
2000	18,028		—
2010	19,180		6.4%
2020	21,080		9.9%

As of the 2010 U.S. census, there were 19,180 people, 7,814 households, and 5,339 families residing in the township. The population density was 1,115.1 inhabitants per square mile (430.5/km^{2}). There were 8,180 housing units at an average density of 475.6 units per square mile (183.6 units/km^{2}). The racial makeup of the township was 89.8% White, 2.8% African American, 0.1% Native American, 4.7% Asian, 1.3% from other races, and 1.3% from two or more races. Hispanic or Latino of any race were 4.7% of the population.

There were 7,814 households, out of which 29.5% had children under the age of 18 living with them, 56.6% were married couples living together, 8.5% had a female householder with no husband present, and 31.7% were non-families. 24.827% of all households were made up of individuals, and 35.1% had someone living alone who was 65 years of age or older. The average household size was 2.38 and the average family size was 2.89.

In the township, the population was spread out, with 21.6% under the age of 20, 3.9% from 20 to 24, 20.8% from 25 to 44, 31.7% from 45 to 64, and 22% who were 65 years of age or older. The median age was 46 years. For every 100 females, there were 89.6 males. For every 100 females age 18 and over, there were 86.9 males. The median income for a household in the township was $64,854, and the median income for a family was $78,629. Males had a median income of $55,047 versus $41,610 for females. The per capita income for the township was $36,274. About 2.6% of families and 3.8% of the population were below the poverty line, including 5.73% of those under age 18 and 4.2% of those age 65 or over.

== Recreation ==
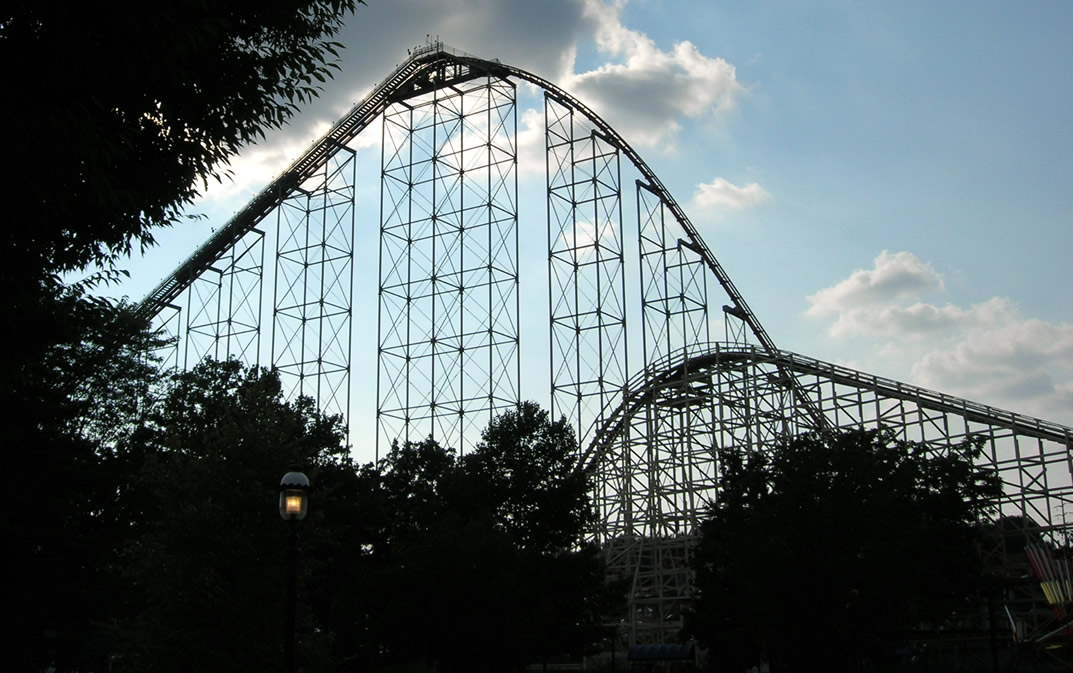
Dorney Park & Wildwater Kingdom's Steel Force and Thunderhawk roller coasters in South Whitehall Township; Steel Force is the eighth-tallest steel roller coaster in the world with a first drop of 205 feet (62 m) and a top speed of 75 miles per hour (121 km/h).

South Whitehall Township is best known as the home of Dorney Park and Wildwater Kingdom, a popular amusement park. It also hosts the Lehigh County Soccer Fields, which are accessible from Broadway east of Route 309.

== Government and politics ==
South Whitehall is represented by State Senator Jarrett Coleman in the 16th Senatorial district and State Representative Michael Schlossberg in the 132nd State House district. At the federal level, South Whitehall is represented by Ryan Mackenzie in the 7th congressional district.

The South Whitehall Township Board of Commissioners is the governing body of the township and is composed of five citizens, elected at-large for four-year terms. As of January 5, 2026, the members of the Board of Commissioners are as follows:

- Jacob D. Roth, President
- Diane Kelly, Vice President
- Thomas Johns
- Sharon Fehlinger-Ricker
- Glenn Guanowsky

United States presidential election results for South Whitehall Township, Pennsylvania
Year	Republican		Democratic		Third party(ies)	
Year	No.	%	No.	%	No.	%
2024	6,163	46.44%	6,895	51.96%	212	1.60%
2020	5,735	45.28%	6,791	53.62%	140	1.11%
2016	5,125	48.05%	5,198	48.73%	343	3.22%
2012	4,981	49.32%	5,010	49.61%	108	1.07%
2008	4,701	45.10%	5,590	53.63%	133	1.28%
2004	5,027	50.37%	4,894	49.04%	59	0.59%

== Education ==
The township is served by the Parkland School District. Students in grades 9 through 12 attend Parkland High School, located on Cedar Crest Boulevard in the township. Both of middle schools (Orefield and Springhouse) are in South Whitehall, as are Cetronia, Kratzer, and Parkway Manor Elementary Schools. Some of the township's students attend Kernsville Elementary just over the North Whitehall line, while others attend Ironton Elementary located in North Whitehall Township. Kratzer is located in Greenawalds.

== Transportation ==
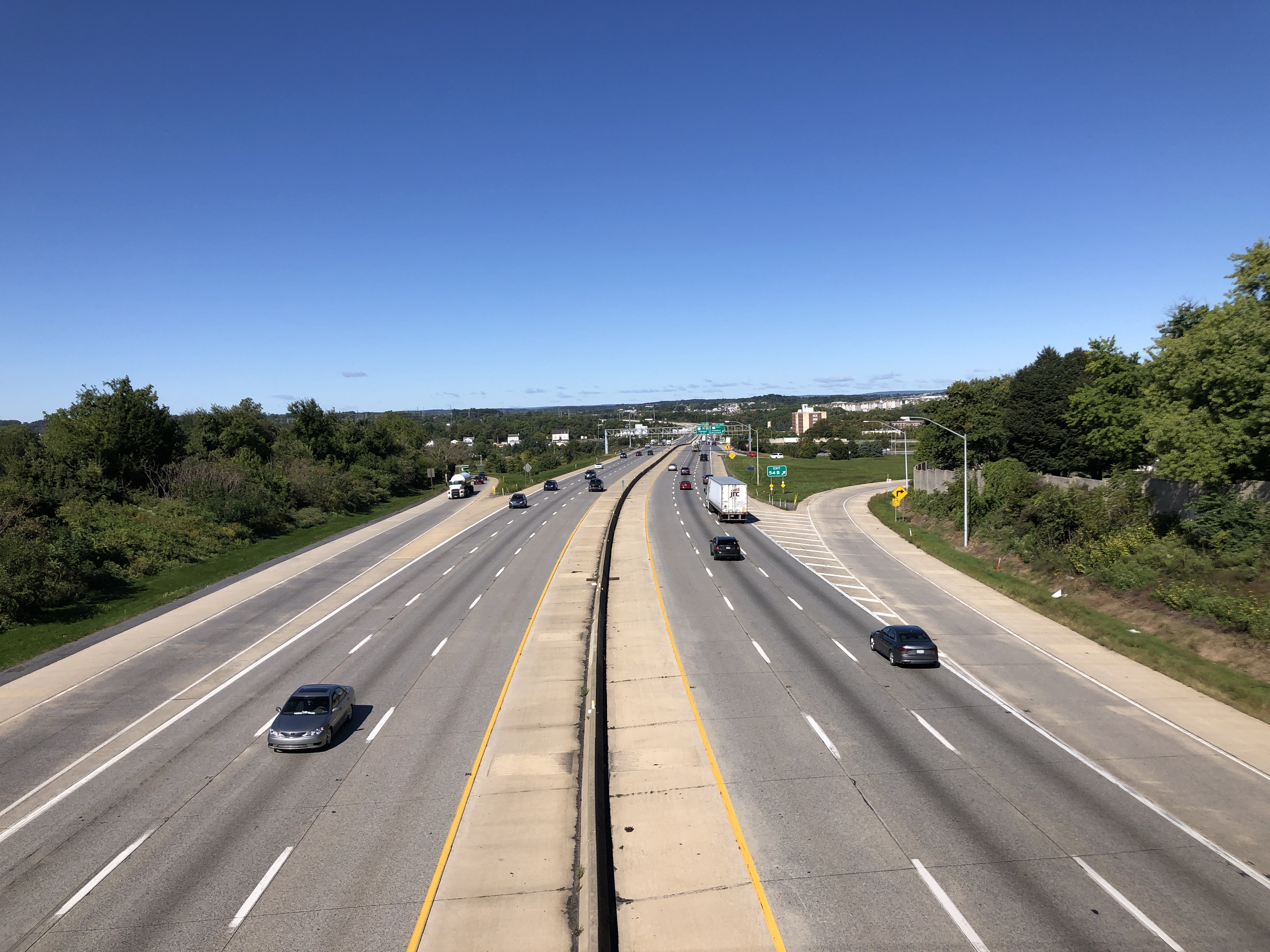
The interchange of I-78 West and PA Route 309 North in South Whitehall Township

As of 2022, there were 145.38 miles (233.97 km) of public roads in South Whitehall Township, of which 3.50 miles (5.63 km) were maintained by the Pennsylvania Turnpike Commission (PTC), 33.68 miles (54.20 km) were maintained by the Pennsylvania Department of Transportation (PennDOT) and 108.20 miles (174.13 km) were maintained by the township.

The Lehigh Valley interchange of Interstate 476 and Pennsylvania Turnpike's Northeast Extension with U.S. Route 22 is in the western part of the township. Interstate 78 crosses the southern portion of the township concurrent with Pennsylvania Route 309. Additional thoroughfares include Cedar Crest Boulevard and Mauch Chunk Road north-to-south, and Walbert Avenue, Tilghman Street, Broadway, and Pennsylvania Route 222, also known as Hamilton Boulevard, east-to-west. LANta serves multiple bus routes in South Whitehall Township, connecting Allentown with its western and northern suburbs.
