= 2018–19 Georgia State Panthers men's basketball team =

American college basketball season

2018–19 Georgia State Panthers men's basketball

Sun Belt tournament champions Sun Belt regular season champions

NCAA tournament, First Round
- Conference: Sun Belt Conference
- Record: 24–10 (13–5 Sun Belt)
- Head coach: Ron Hunter (8th season)
- Assistant coaches: Travis Williams (1st season); Ray McCallum (3rd season); Claude Pardue (8th season)
- Home arena: GSU Sports Arena

2018–19 Sun Belt Conference men's basketball standings
	Conf.				Overall
Team	W		L	PCT	W		L	PCT
Georgia State †	13	–	5	.722	24	–	10	.706
UT Arlington	12	–	6	.667	17	–	16	.515
Georgia Southern	12	–	6	.667	21	–	12	.636
Texas State	12	–	6	.667	24	–	10	.706
Louisiana	10	–	8	.556	19	–	13	.594
Coastal Carolina	9	–	9	.500	17	–	17	.500
Louisiana–Monroe	9	–	9	.500	19	–	16	.543
South Alabama	8	–	10	.444	17	–	17	.500
Arkansas State	7	–	11	.389	13	–	19	.406
Appalachian State	6	–	12	.333	11	–	21	.344
Little Rock	5	–	13	.278	10	–	21	.323
Troy	5	–	13	.278	12	–	18	.400
† 2019 Sun Belt Conference tournament winner

The 2018–19 Georgia State Panthers men's basketball team represented Georgia State University during the 2018–19 NCAA Division I men's basketball season. The team's head coach was Ron Hunter, who coached his eighth and final season at Georgia State. The Panthers played their home games at the GSU Sports Arena in Atlanta, Georgia as a member of the Sun Belt Conference. Finishing with a 13–5 conference record, GSU won its third Sun Belt regular season championship in the last six years. The Panthers defeated Texas State, and UT Arlington to become champions of the Sun Belt tournament. As a result, they received the Sun Belt's automatic bid to the NCAA tournament where they lost to Houston in the first round.

== Previous season ==
The Panthers finished the season 24–11, 12–6 in Sun Belt play to finish the regular season in second place. The Panthers defeated Troy, Georgia Southern, and UT Arlington to become champions of the Sun Belt tournament. As a result, they received the Sun Belt's automatic bid to the NCAA tournament. As the No. 15 seed in the West region, they lost to Cincinnati in the first round.

== Offseason ==
=== Departures ===
Name	Number	Pos.	Height	Weight	Year	Hometown	Notes
Nile Felton	0	G	6'3"	175	Sophomore	Atlanta, GA	Left team
Denis Alibegovic	10	G	6'2"	170	Freshman	Downers Grove, IL	Transferred out
Isaiah Williams	11	G	6'2"	170	Senior	Buford, GA	Graduated
Jordan Session	23	F	6'8"	225	Senior	McDonough, GA	Graduated

=== Incoming transfers ===
Name	Number	Pos.	Height	Weight	Year	Hometown	Previous School
Corey Allen	NA	G	6'2"	215	Junior	Ypsilanti, MI	Detroit. Under NCAA transfer rules, Allen will have to sit out for the 2018–19 season, using a redshirt, leaving two years of eligibility remaining.
Justin Roberts	NA	G	5'10"	165	Sophomore	Indianapolis, IN	DePaul. Under NCAA transfer rules, Roberts will have to sit out for the 2018–19 season, using a redshirt, leaving three years of eligibility remaining.

=== 2018 recruiting class ===
College recruiting
Name	Hometown	School	Height	Weight	Commit date
Kavonte Ivery; F	Stockbridge, GA	Stockbridge	6 ft 7 in (2.01 m)	230 lb (100 kg)	Sep 19, 2017
Kavonte Ivery; F	Recruit ratings: Scout: Rivals: 247Sports: ESPN: (78)				
Nelson Phillips; G	Warner Robins, GA	Warner Robins	6 ft 4 in (1.93 m)	175 lb (79 kg)	Sep 22, 2017
Nelson Phillips; G	Recruit ratings: Scout: Rivals: 247Sports: ESPN: (N/A)				
James Wall; F	Canton, GA	Creekview	6 ft 8 in (2.03 m)	190 lb (86 kg)	Sep 8, 2016
James Wall; F	Recruit ratings: Scout: Rivals: 247Sports: ESPN: (N/A)				
Overall recruit ranking: Scout: 93 Rivals: NA ESPN: NA
Note: In many cases, Scout, Rivals, 247Sports, On3, and ESPN may conflict in their listings of height and weight.; In these cases, the average was taken. ESPN grades are on a 100-point scale.; Sources: "Georgia State Panthers". ESPN.; "2018 Team Ranking". Rivals.

== Roster ==
2018–19 Georgia State Panthers men's basketball team
Players
Coaches

Pos.	#	Name	Height	Weight	Year	Previous school	Hometown
F	0	Kavonte Ivery	6 ft 7 in (2.01 m)	230 lb (104 kg)	Fr	Stockbridge	Stockbridge, GA
G	1	Damon Wilson	6 ft 5 in (1.96 m)	200 lb (91 kg)	Jr	Our Savior New American / Pittsburgh	New York, NY
G	2	Malik Benlevi (C)	6 ft 6 in (1.98 m)	225 lb (102 kg)	Sr	Jenkins	Savannah, GA
G	10	Nelson Phillips	6 ft 4 in (1.93 m)	175 lb (79 kg)	Fr	Warner Robins	Warner Robins, GA
G	12	Kane Williams	6 ft 3 in (1.91 m)	190 lb (86 kg)	So	South Paulding	Douglasville, GA
F	14	Chris Clerkly (injured)	6 ft 9 in (2.06 m)	235 lb (107 kg)	Jr	Perry	Perry, GA
G	15	D'Marcus Simonds (C)	6 ft 3 in (1.91 m)	195 lb (88 kg)	Jr	Gainesville	Gainesville, GA
F	20	Josh Linder	6 ft 9 in (2.06 m)	205 lb (93 kg)	So	Veterans	Kathleen, GA
F	21	James Wall (W)	6 ft 8 in (2.03 m)	190 lb (86 kg)	Fr	Creekview	Canton, GA
G	24	Devin Mitchell	6 ft 4 in (1.93 m)	190 lb (86 kg)	RS Sr	Collins Hill / Alabama	Suwanee, GA
F	30	Jeff Thomas	6 ft 5 in (1.96 m)	190 lb (86 kg)	RS Sr	Norwalk	Norwalk, OH
G	35	Matt Chism (W)	6 ft 3 in (1.91 m)	185 lb (84 kg)	So	Dawson Christian Academy	Dawsonville, GA
F	50	Jordan Tyson	6 ft 9 in (2.06 m)	220 lb (100 kg)	RS Sr	Walnut Hills / St. Bonaventure	Cincinnati, OH
G	NA	Corey Allen (redshirt)	6 ft 2 in (1.88 m)	215 lb (98 kg)	Jr	Ypsilanti / Detroit	Ypsilanti, MI
G	NA	Justin Roberts (redshirt)	5 ft 10 in (1.78 m)	165 lb (75 kg)	So	Henderson International School / DePaul	Indianapolis, IN

Head coach

- Ron Hunter (Miami (OH))

Assistant coach(es)

- Ray McCallum (Ball State)
- Travis Williams (Georgia State)
- Claude Pardue (Emory)

Legend

- (C) Team captain
- (S) Suspended
- (I) Ineligible
- (W) Walk-on
- Injured
- Current redshirt

== Preseason ==
- Junior D'Marcus Simonds named to Preseason Mid-Major All-American first team by NBC Sports.
- Georgia State was unanimously picked as conference preseason favorite to win the Sun Belt Conference, receiving votes from all Sun Belt schools.
- D'Marcus Simonds was chosen as Preseason Player of the Year by the Sun Belt Conference.
- D'Marcus Simonds was chosen to the Sun Belt All-Conference Preseason First Team.
- Senior, Devin Mitchell, was chosen to the Sun Belt All-Conference Preseason Second Team.

== Regular season ==
- The Panthers placed third in the Cayman Islands Classic after routing in-state rival Georgia by a score of 91–67.
- GSU rallied from a 21-point deficit to beat the Alabama Crimson Tide, 83–80, in Tuscaloosa during non-conference play. As of February 22, 2019, GSU owns more SEC wins than UGA (1) and Vanderbilt (0) and as many as Missouri (2).
- Against Troy on February 13, Simonds became Georgia State's all-time leader in career made field goals.
- Seniors, Jeff Thomas and Devin Mitchell each hit their career 200th 3-pointers in the same game at Appalachian State on February 21.
- On March 9, Georgia State completed a season sweep of in-state rival Georgia Southern, marking the rivalry's first away win since 1996. With the victory, the Panthers clinched their third Sun Belt regular season championship in six years.
- Junior, D'Marcus Simonds was selected as All-Conference First Team.

== Post-season ==
- Senior, Malik Benlevi was named Most Outstanding Player in the Sun Belt tournament.
- D'Marcus Simonds and Kane Williams were both named to the SBC All-Tournament Team.

== Schedule and results ==
Date time, TV	Rank^{#}	Opponent^{#}	Result	Record	High points	High rebounds	High assists	Site (attendance) city, state
Exhibition
November 1, 2018*; 7:00 pm		Georgia College	W 78–58		26 – Benlevi	9 – Thomas	5 – Tied	GSU Sports Arena; Atlanta, GA
Non-conference regular season
November 6, 2018*; 7:00 pm, ESPN+		ETSU	W 74–68	1–0	26 – Thomas	11 – Wilson	3 – Thomas	GSU Sports Arena (1,688); Atlanta, GA
November 9, 2018*; 9:00 pm		at Montana	L 74–81	1–1	30 – Simonds	7 – Tied	5 – Williams	Dahlberg Arena (4,321); Missoula, MT
November 13, 2018*; 7:00 pm, ESPN+		Mercer	W 62–60	2–1	30 – Thomas	6 – Simonds	5 – Thomas	GSU Sports Arena (1,579); Atlanta, GA
November 19, 2018*; 5:00 pm, Stadium		vs. St. Bonaventure; Cayman Islands Classic quarterfinals	W 62–60	3–1	25 – Simonds	9 – Phillips	6 – Williams	John Gray Gymnasium (780); George Town, Cayman Islands
November 20, 2018*; 7:30pm, Stadium		vs. Creighton; Cayman Islands Classic semifinals	L 68–93	3–2	21 – Simonds	6 – Tied	2 – Thomas	John Gray Gymnasium (1,558); Georgetown, Cayman Islands
November 21, 2018*; 4:00pm, Stadium		vs. Georgia; Cayman Islands Classic 3rd place game	W 91–67	4–2	24 – Benlevi	7 – Benlevi	8 – Simonds	John Gray Gymnasium (781); Georgetown, Cayman Islands
November 28, 2018*; 1:00 pm		at Tulane	W 80–76	5–2	25 – Benlevi	7 – Thomas	5 – Tied	Devlin Fieldhouse (1,450); New Orleans, LA
December 1, 2018*; 6:00 pm, ESPN+		at Liberty	L 52–78	5-3	22 – Simonds	6 – Wilson	5 – Simonds	Vines Center (2,966); Lynchburg, VA
December 4, 2018*; 8:00 pm, SEC+		at Alabama	W 83–80	6–3	23 – Simonds	8 – Benlevi	5 – Williams	Coleman Coliseum (9,076); Tuscaloosa, AL
December 12, 2018*; 7:00 pm, ESPN+		Chattanooga	W 95–88	7–3	24 – Simonds	6 – Simonds	5 – Simonds	GSU Sports Arena (3,854); Atlanta, GA
December 15, 2018*; 8:00 PM, FSN		at No. 25 Kansas State	L 59–71	7–4	13 – Thomas	6 – Tyson	3 – Simonds	Bramlage Coliseum (9,563); Manhattan, KS
December 19, 2018*; 7:00 pm, ESPN+		UNCW	W 86–71	8–4	23 – Mitchell	9 – Simonds	7 – Simonds	GSU Sports Arena (1,324); Atlanta, GA
December 29, 2018*; 1:00 pm, ESPN+		Middle Georgia State	W 117–69	9–4	21 – Mitchell	7 – Thomas	6 – Thomas	GSU Sports Arena (1,373); Atlanta, GA
Sun Belt Conference regular season
January 3, 2019; 8:00 pm, ESPN+		at UT Arlington	W 63–58	10–4 (1–0)	15 – Simonds	6 – Thomas	4 – Williams	College Park Center (1,425); Arlington, TX
January 5, 2019; 5:00 pm, ESPN+		at Texas State	W 73–69	11–4 (2–0)	22 – Benlevi	12 – Simonds	4 – Tied	Strahan Coliseum (1,437); San Marcos, TX
January 10, 2019; 7:00 pm, ESPN+		Louisiana	W 89–76	12–4 (3–0)	21 – Simonds	9 – Benlevi	6 – Tied	GSU Sports Arena (1,211); Atlanta, GA
January 12, 2019; 1:00 pm, ESPN+		ULM	W 74–73	13–4 (4–0)	24 – Simonds	8 – Phillips	5 – Williams	GSU Sports Arena (1,566); Atlanta, GA
January 17, 2019; 8:00 pm, ESPN+		at South Alabama	W 69–66	14–4 (5–0)	18 – Simonds	9 – Tied	6 – Simonds	Mitchell Center (1,985); Mobile, AL
January 19, 2019; 3:00 pm, ESPN+		at Troy	L 75–77	14–5 (5–1)	28 – Simonds	9 – Simonds	4 – Simonds	Trojan Arena (3,117); Troy, AL
January 24, 2019; 7:00 pm, ESPN+		Texas State	L 68–81	14–6 (5–2)	20 – Mitchell	7 – Thomas	5 – Simonds	GSU Sports Arena (1,984); Atlanta, GA
January 26, 2019; 1:00 pm, ESPN+		UT Arlington	W 77–71	15–6 (6–2)	27 – Thomas	7 – Wilson	5 – Williams	GSU Sports Arena (1,669); Atlanta, GA
February 2, 2019; 1:00 pm, ESPN+		Georgia Southern; Modern Day Hate	W 81–71	16–6 (7–2)	29 – Simonds	8 – Tyson	4 – Williams	GSU Sports Arena (3,854); Atlanta, GA
February 6, 2019; 8:00 pm, ESPN+		at ULM	L 76–82	16–7 (7–3)	18 – Simonds	6 – Benlevi	6 – Simonds	Fant–Ewing Coliseum (2,391); Monroe, LA
February 8, 2019; 9:00 pm, ESPN2		at Louisiana	L 72–76	16–8 (7–4)	21 – Mitchell	6 – Tied	4 – Williams	Cajundome (4,814); Lafayette, LA
February 13, 2019; 7:00 pm, ESPN+		Troy	W 77–63	17–8 (8–4)	27 – Simonds	7 – Tied	6 – Simonds	GSU Sports Arena (1,426); Atlanta, GA
February 16, 2019; 7:00 pm, ESPN+		South Alabama	W 90–81	18–8 (9–4)	26 – Benlevi	7 – Tied	6 – Williams	GSU Sports Arena (1,531); Atlanta, GA
February 21, 2019; 7:00 pm, ESPN+		at Appalachian State	W 80–75	19–8 (10–4)	20 – Benlevi	9 – Benlevi	4 – Simonds	Holmes Convocation Center (1,653); Boone, NC
February 23, 2019; 2:00 pm, ESPN+		at Coastal Carolina	L 82–95	19–9 (10–5)	31 – Simonds	6 – Wilson	5 – Williams	HTC Center (1,469); Conway, SC
February 28, 2019; 7:00 pm, ESPN+		Arkansas State	W 76–60	20–9 (11–5)	15 – Thomas	6 – Benlevi	5 – Williams	GSU Sports Arena (1,615); Atlanta, GA
March 2, 2019; 1:00 pm, ESPN+		Little Rock	W 83–70	21–9 (12–5)	17 – Williams	9 – Tyson	5 – Simonds	GSU Sports Arena (2,004); Atlanta, GA
March 9, 2019; 5:00 pm, ESPN+		at Georgia Southern; Modern Day Hate	W 90–85	22–9 (13–5)	23 – Williams	11 – Wilson	6 – Wilson	Hanner Fieldhouse (3,897); Statesboro, GA
Sun Belt tournament
March 16, 2019; 3:00 pm, ESPN+	(1)	vs. (4) Texas State; Semifinals	W 59–46	23–9	15 – Benlevi	10 – Benlevi	5 – Simonds	Lakefront Arena (1,344); New Orleans, LA
March 17, 2019; 1:00 pm, ESPN2	(1)	vs. (2) UT Arlington; Championship	W 73–64	24–9	16 – Benlevi	11 – Benlevi	5 – Williams	Lakefront Arena (1,473); New Orleans, LA
NCAA tournament
March 22, 2019*; 7:20 pm, TBS	(14 MW)	vs. (3 MW) No. 11 Houston; First Round	L 55–84	24–10	18 – Simonds	7 – Wilson	2 – Simonds	BOK Center (12,443); Tulsa, OK
*Non-conference game. ^{#}Rankings from AP Poll. (#) Tournament seedings in parentheses. MW=Midwest. All times are in Eastern Time.
