= 2018–19 Arkansas State Red Wolves men's basketball team =

American college basketball season

2018–19 Arkansas State Red Wolves men's basketball
- Conference: Sun Belt Conference
- Record: 13–19 (7–11 Sun Belt)
- Head coach: Mike Balado (2nd season)
- Assistant coaches: Vince Walden; Casey Stanley; Mike Scutero
- Home arena: First National Bank Arena

2018–19 Sun Belt Conference men's basketball standings
| | Conf. | | | | Overall |
| Team | W | | L | PCT | W | | L | PCT |
|---|---|---|---|---|---|---|---|---|
| Georgia State † | 13 | – | 5 | .722 | 24 | – | 10 | .706 |
| UT Arlington | 12 | – | 6 | .667 | 17 | – | 16 | .515 |
| Georgia Southern | 12 | – | 6 | .667 | 21 | – | 12 | .636 |
| Texas State | 12 | – | 6 | .667 | 24 | – | 10 | .706 |
| Louisiana | 10 | – | 8 | .556 | 19 | – | 13 | .594 |
| Coastal Carolina | 9 | – | 9 | .500 | 17 | – | 17 | .500 |
| Louisiana–Monroe | 9 | – | 9 | .500 | 19 | – | 16 | .543 |
| South Alabama | 8 | – | 10 | .444 | 17 | – | 17 | .500 |
| Arkansas State | 7 | – | 11 | .389 | 13 | – | 19 | .406 |
| Appalachian State | 6 | – | 12 | .333 | 11 | – | 21 | .344 |
| Little Rock | 5 | – | 13 | .278 | 10 | – | 21 | .323 |
| Troy | 5 | – | 13 | .278 | 12 | – | 18 | .400 |
† 2019 Sun Belt Conference tournament winner

The 2018–19 Arkansas State Red Wolves men's basketball team represented Arkansas State University during the 2018–19 NCAA Division I men's basketball season. The Red Wolves, led by second-year head coach Mike Balado, played their home games at the First National Bank Arena in Jonesboro, Arkansas as members of the Sun Belt Conference.

== Previous season ==
The Red Wolves finished the 2017–18 season 11–21, 6–12 in Sun Belt play to finish in 11th place. They lost in the first round of the Sun Belt tournament to Louisiana–Monroe.

== Roster ==
2018–19 Arkansas State Red Wolves men's basketball team
Players
Coaches

| Pos. | # | Name | Height | Weight | Year | Hometown |
|---|---|---|---|---|---|---|
| G | 0 | Ty Cockfield II | 6 ft 0 in (1.83 m) | 185 lb (84 kg) | Sr | Gainesville, Georgia |
| G | 1 | Kobe Wilson | 6 ft 2 in (1.88 m) | 188 lb (85 kg) | Fr | Palestine, Texas |
| F | 2 | Salif Boudie | 6 ft 8 in (2.03 m) | 215 lb (98 kg) | Jr | Mali, West Africa |
| F | 3 | Malik Brevard | 6 ft 8 in (2.03 m) | 215 lb (98 kg) | Jr | Charlotte, North Carolina |
| G | 4 | Tristin Walley | 6 ft 7 in (2.01 m) | 215 lb (98 kg) | RS Sr | Richton, Mississippi |
| G | 5 | Christian Willis | 6 ft 1 in (1.85 m) | 190 lb (86 kg) | RS So | Belleville, Illinois |
| G | 10 | Grantham Gillard | 6 ft 4 in (1.93 m) | 205 lb (93 kg) | Sr | Minneapolis, Minnesota |
| F | 11 | J.J. Matthews | 6 ft 9 in (2.06 m) | 240 lb (109 kg) | RS So | Richmond, Virginia |
| G | 12 | Canberk Kus | 6 ft 6 in (1.98 m) | 207 lb (94 kg) | Jr | Istanbul, Turkey |
| F | 15 | Jake Scoggins | 6 ft 9 in (2.06 m) | 220 lb (100 kg) | RS So | Benton, Arkansas |
| G | 22 | Jonathan Adams, Jr. | 6 ft 3 in (1.91 m) | 209 lb (95 kg) | So | Jonesboro, Arkansas |
| G | 23 | Marquis Eaton | 6 ft 2 in (1.88 m) | 197 lb (89 kg) | So | Helena, Arkansas |
| F | 25 | Shaquillo Fritz | 6 ft 8 in (2.03 m) | 210 lb (95 kg) | RS Jr | Freeport, Bahamas |

Head coach

- Mike Balado (St. Thomas)

Assistant coach(es)

- Vince Walden (Longwood)
- Casey Stanely (Iona)
- Mike Scutero (Central Florida)

Legend

- (C) Team captain
- (S) Suspended
- (I) Ineligible
- (W) Walk-on
- Injured
- Current redshirt

Roster
Last update: January 4, 2019

== Schedule and results ==
| Date time, TV | Rank^{#} | Opponent^{#} | Result | Record | Site (attendance) city, state |
Exhibition
| Nov 4, 2018*; 7:00 pm | | Lyon | W 80–56 | | First National Bank Arena; Jonesboro, AR |
Non-conference regular season
| Nov 9, 2018*; 7:30 pm | | at Abilene Christian | L 73–94 | 0–1 | Moody Coliseum (1,209); Abilene, TX |
| Nov 12, 2018*; 7:30 pm | | Missouri Baptist | W 89–54 | 1–1 | First National Bank Arena (1,305); Jonesboro, AR |
| Nov 16, 2018*; 8:00 pm, ESPN3 | | at Grand Canyon | L 72–96 | 1–2 | GCU Arena (7,121); Phoenix, AZ |
| Nov 24, 2018*; 5:00 pm | | vs. Eastern Illinois; Battle in the Blue Ridge | L 86–90 | 1–4 | U.S. Cellular Center (1,250); Asheville, NC |
| Nov 25, 2018*; 2:30 pm | | vs. Gardner–Webb; Battle in the Blue Ridge | W 77–69 | 2–4 | U.S. Cellular Center (1,037); Asheville, NC |
| Dec 1, 2018*; 1:00 pm | | at Lehigh | L 70–82 | 2–5 | Stabler Arena (837); Bethlehem, PA |
| Dec 4, 2018*; 7:00 pm | | Evansville | W 87–77 | 3–5 | First National Bank Arena (1,305); Jonesboro, AR |
| Dec 8, 2018*; 3:00 pm, BTN Plus | | at Minnesota | L 56–72 | 3–6 | Williams Arena (10,257); Minneapolis, MN |
| Dec 14, 2018*; 7:00 pm | | Florida Atlantic | W 75–71 ^{2OT} | 4–6 | First National Bank Arena (1,116); Jonesboro, AR |
| Dec 18, 2018*; 7:00 pm | | Missouri State | W 71–63 | 5–6 | First National Bank Arena (1,409); Jonesboro, AR |
| Dec 22, 2018*; 1:00 pm, ACCRSN | | at Syracuse | L 52–82 | 5–7 | Carrier Dome (18,808); Syracuse, NY |
| Dec 29, 2018*; 7:00 pm | | Harding | W 87–62 | 6–7 | First National Bank Arena (1,087); Jonesboro, AR |
Sun Belt Conference regular season
| Jan 3, 2019; 7:00 pm, ESPN+ | | at Louisiana | W 94–83 | 7–7 (1–0) | Cajundome (3,532); Lafayette, LA |
| Jan 5, 2019; 2:00 pm, ESPN+ | | at Louisiana–Monroe | L 75–85 | 7–8 (1–1) | Fant–Ewing Coliseum (2,373); Monroe, LA |
| Jan 10, 2019; 7:00 pm, ESPN+ | | South Alabama | W 66–65 | 8–8 (2–1) | First National Bank Arena (1,374); Jonesboro, AR |
| Jan 12, 2019; 4:00 pm, ESPN+ | | Troy | L 85–90 ^{OT} | 8–9 (2–2) | First National Bank Arena (1,802); Jonesboro, AR |
| Jan 17, 2019; 7:00 pm, ESPN+ | | at UT Arlington | W 66–59 | 8–10 (2–3) | College Park Center (2,013); Arlington, TX |
| Jan 19, 2019; 4:00 pm, ESPN+ | | at Texas State | L 64–77 | 8–11 (2–4) | Strahan Coliseum (4,163); San Marcos, TX |
| Jan 24, 2019; 7:00 pm, ESPN+ | | Appalachian State | W 82–81 | 9–11 (3–4) | First National Bank Arena (2,112); Jonesboro, AR |
| Jan 26, 2019; 4:00 pm, ESPN+ | | Coastal Carolina | L 64–77 | 9–12 (3–5) | First National Bank Arena (1,932); Jonesboro, AR |
| Feb 2, 2019; 5:30 pm, ESPN+ | | at Little Rock | W 84–83 | 10–12 (4–5) | Jack Stephens Center (3,909); Little Rock, AR |
| Feb 7, 2019; 7:00 pm, ESPN+ | | at South Alabama | L 62-70 | 10-13 (4-6) | Mitchell Center (1,785); Mobile, AL |
| Feb 9, 2019; 2:00 pm, ESPN+ | | at Troy | L 79-84 | 10-14 (4-7) | Trojan Arena (2,214); Troy, AL |
| Feb 14, 2019; 7:00 pm, ESPN+ | | Texas State | L 74-84 | 10-15 (4-8) | First National Bank Arena (1,264); Jonesboro, AR |
| Feb 16, 2019; 4:00 pm, ESPN+ | | UT Arlington | W 83-79 | 11-15 (5-8) | First National Bank Arena (1,608); Jonesboro, AR |
| Feb 23, 2019; 4:00 pm, ESPN+ | | Little Rock | W 72-65 | 12-15 (6-8) | First National Bank Arena (2,278); Jonesboro, AR |
| Feb 28, 2019; 6:00 pm, ESPN+ | | at Georgia State | L 60-76 | 12-16 (6-9) | GSU Sports Arena (1,615); Atlanta, GA |
| Mar 2, 2019; 4:00 pm | | at Georgia Southern | L 70-81 | 12-17 (6-10) | Hanner Fieldhouse (1,986); Statesboro, GA |
| Mar 7, 2019; 7:00 pm, ESPN+ | | Louisiana–Monroe | W 73-72 | 13-17 (7-10) | First National Bank Arena (1,573); Jonesboro, AR |
| Mar 9, 2019; 4:00 pm, ESPN+ | | Louisiana | L 87-90 ^{OT} | 13-18 (7-11) | First National Bank Arena (2,407); Jonesboro, AR |
Sun Belt tournament
| Mar 12, 2019; 7:00 pm, ESPN+ | (9) | vs. (8) South Alabama; First Round | L 67-75 | 13-19 | Mitchell Center (1,624); Mobile, AL |
*Non-conference game. ^{#}Rankings from AP Poll. (#) Tournament seedings in parentheses. All times are in Central Time. Source.
