= 2018–19 Coastal Carolina Chanticleers men's basketball team =

American college basketball season

2018–19 Coastal Carolina Chanticleers men's basketball

CBI, Semifinals
- Conference: Sun Belt Conference
- Record: 17–17 (9–9 Sun Belt)
- Head coach: Cliff Ellis (12th season)
- Assistant coaches: Benny Moss; Patrice Days; Patrick Blake
- Home arena: HTC Center

2018–19 Sun Belt Conference men's basketball standings
	Conf.				Overall
Team	W		L	PCT	W		L	PCT
Georgia State †	13	–	5	.722	24	–	10	.706
UT Arlington	12	–	6	.667	17	–	16	.515
Georgia Southern	12	–	6	.667	21	–	12	.636
Texas State	12	–	6	.667	24	–	10	.706
Louisiana	10	–	8	.556	19	–	13	.594
Coastal Carolina	9	–	9	.500	17	–	17	.500
Louisiana–Monroe	9	–	9	.500	19	–	16	.543
South Alabama	8	–	10	.444	17	–	17	.500
Arkansas State	7	–	11	.389	13	–	19	.406
Appalachian State	6	–	12	.333	11	–	21	.344
Little Rock	5	–	13	.278	10	–	21	.323
Troy	5	–	13	.278	12	–	18	.400
† 2019 Sun Belt Conference tournament winner

The 2018–19 Coastal Carolina Chanticleers men's basketball team represented Coastal Carolina University during the 2018–19 NCAA Division I men's basketball season. The Chanticleers, led by 12th-year head coach Cliff Ellis, played their home games at the HTC Center in Conway, South Carolina as members of the Sun Belt Conference. They finished the season 17-17, 9–9 in Sun Belt Play to tor for 6th place. They lost in the second round of the Sun Belt tournament to Louisiana-Monroe. They received an at-large bid to the College Basketball Invitational where they defeated Howard and West Virginia to advance to the semifinals where they lost to DePaul.

== Previous season ==
The Chanticleers finished the 2017–18 season 14–18, 8–10 in Sun Belt play to finish in eighth place. They lost in the first round of the Sun Belt tournament to Texas State.

== Roster ==
2018–19 Coastal Carolina Chanticleers men's basketball team
Players
Coaches

Pos.	#	Name	Height	Weight	Year	Hometown
G	0	Ebrima Dibba	6 ft 6 in (1.98 m)	200 lb (91 kg)	Fr	Bredäng, Sweden
G	1	David Pierce	6 ft 3 in (1.91 m)	215 lb (98 kg)	Fr	St. Petersburg, Florida
G	2	Josh Peterson	5 ft 10 in (1.78 m)	165 lb (75 kg)	Jr	Woodbridge, Virginia
G	3	DeVante' Jones	6 ft 1 in (1.85 m)	200 lb (91 kg)	RS Fr	New Orleans, Louisiana
G	4	Ajay Sanders	6 ft 4 in (1.93 m)	200 lb (91 kg)	Sr	Greenville, North Carolina
G	5	Malik Legania	6 ft 5 in (1.96 m)	180 lb (82 kg)	Fr	New Orleans, Louisiana
G	10	Tyrell Gumbs-Frater	6 ft 3 in (1.91 m)	190 lb (86 kg)	Jr	Richmond Hill, Ontario
F	11	Amidou Bamba	6 ft 8 in (2.03 m)	240 lb (109 kg)	Jr	Toronto, Ontario
G	12	Matt Lindsey	6 ft 1 in (1.85 m)	190 lb (86 kg)	Sr	North Myrtle Beach, South Carolina
G	13	David Kralj	6 ft 4 in (1.93 m)	210 lb (95 kg)	Fr	Ljubljana, Slovenia
G	14	Trevion Brown	6 ft 2 in (1.88 m)	165 lb (75 kg)	So	Tacoma, Washington
F	15	Isaac Hippolyte	6 ft 7 in (2.01 m)	210 lb (95 kg)	RS Fr	Spring Valley, New York
G	22	Bill Muse	6 ft 2 in (1.88 m)	185 lb (84 kg)	Sr	Muskogee, Oklahoma
C	30	Josh Coleman	6 ft 9 in (2.06 m)	240 lb (109 kg)	Sr	Alpharetta, Georgia
F	33	Tommy Burton	6 ft 8 in (2.03 m)	210 lb (95 kg)	Jr	Montgomery, Alabama
F	40	Zac Cuthbertson	6 ft 7 in (2.01 m)	195 lb (88 kg)	RS Sr	New Bern, North Carolina

Head coach

- Cliff Ellis (Florida State)

Assistant coach(es)

- Benny Moss (Charlotte)
- Patrice Days (New Orleans)
- Patrick Blake (Louisville)

Legend

- (C) Team captain
- (S) Suspended
- (I) Ineligible
- (W) Walk-on
- Injured
- Current redshirt

Roster

== Schedule and results ==
Date time, TV	Rank^{#}	Opponent^{#}	Result	Record	Site (attendance) city, state
Exhibition
Oct 27, 2018*; 3:00 pm		South Carolina State	W 74–54		HTC Center; Conway, SC
Non-conference regular season
Nov 6, 2018*; 7:30 pm, ESPN+		Ferrum	W 91–47	1–0	HTC Center (1,987); Conway, SC
Nov 9, 2018*; 7:30 pm, ESPN+		at Campbell	W 85–75	2–0	Gore Arena (1,757); Buies Creek, NC
Nov 13, 2018*; 8:00 pm		at Tulane	L 76–81	2–1	Devlin Fieldhouse (1,241); New Orleans, LA
Nov 16, 2018*; 4:30 pm, ESPN3		vs. Manhattan; NKU Basketball Classic	L 53–55	2–2	BB&T Arena (318); Highland Heights, KY
Nov 17, 2018*; 4:30 pm, ESPN3		vs. UNC Asheville; NKU Basketball Classic	W 78–52	3–2	BB&T Arena (273); Highland Heights, KY
Nov 18, 2018*; 6:00 pm, FSOH		at Northern Kentucky; NKU Basketball Classic	L 83–89	3–3	BB&T Arena (2,718); Highland Heights, KY
Nov 20, 2018*; 7:00 pm		Methodist	W 88–57	4–3	HTC Center (704); Conway, SC
Nov 30, 2018*; 7:00 pm, SECN		at South Carolina	L 79–85	4–4	Colonial Life Arena (9,315); Columbia, SC
Dec 5, 2018*; 7:30 pm		Hampton	W 75–66	5–4	HTC Center (1,133); Conway, SC
Dec 9, 2018*; 2:00 pm		at Wofford	L 71–82	5–5	Jerry Richardson Indoor Stadium (1,473); Spartanburg, SC
Dec 16, 2018*; 2:00 pm		North Carolina Central	W 69–65	6–5	HTC Center (750); Conway, SC
Dec 21, 2018*; 7:00 pm		at College of Charleston	L 71–73	6–6	TD Arena (4,054); Charleston, SC
Sun Belt Conference regular season
Jan 3, 2019; 7:00 pm, ESPN+		at Troy	W 88–75	7–6 (1–0)	Trojan Arena (2,131); Troy, AL
Jan 5, 2019; 3:30 pm, ESPN+		at South Alabama	L 77–84 ^{2OT}	7–7 (1–1)	Mitchell Center (2,091); Mobile, AL
Jan 10, 2019; 7:00 pm, ESPN+		Texas State	L 61–65	7–8 (1–2)	HTC Center (836); Conway, SC
Jan 12, 2019; 2:00 pm, ESPN+		UT Arlington	L 58–61	7–9 (1–3)	HTC Center (989); Conway, SC
Jan 19, 2019; 2:00 pm, ESPN+		Appalachian State	W 89–72	8–9 (2–3)	HTC Center (2,031); Conway, SC
Jan 24, 2019; 8:30 pm, ESPN+		at Little Rock	W 72–71	9–9 (3–3)	Jack Stephens Center (1,459); Little Rock, AR
Jan 26, 2019; 8:00 pm, ESPN+		at Arkansas State	W 77–64	10–9 (4–3)	First National Bank Arena (1,932); Jonesboro, AR
Jan 31, 2019; 7:00 pm, ESPN+		Louisiana–Monroe	W 92–81	11–9 (5–3)	HTC Center (1,035); Conway, SC
Feb 2, 2019; 2:00 pm, ESPN+		Louisiana	W 96–79	12–9 (6–3)	HTC Center (1,454); Conway, SC
Feb 7, 2019; 8:00 pm, ESPN+		at UT Arlington	L 54–74	12–10 (6–4)	College Park Center (1,919); Arlington, TX
Feb 9, 2019; 5:00 pm, ESPN+		at Texas State	L 57–65	12–11 (6–5)	Strahan Coliseum (4,583); San Marcos, TX
Feb 16, 2019; 2:00 pm, ESPN+		at Appalachian State	L 79–88	12–12 (6–6)	Holmes Center (2,037); Boone, North Carolina
Feb 21, 2019; 7:00 pm, ESPN+		Georgia Southern	L 74–79	12–13 (6–7)	HTC Center (1,483); Conway, SC
Feb 23, 2019; 2:00 pm, ESPN+		Georgia State	W 95–82	13–13 (7–7)	HTC Center (1,469); Conway, SC
Feb 28, 2019; 8:00 pm, ESPN+		at Louisiana	L 70–83	13–14 (7–8)	Cajundome (3,697); Lafayette, LA
Mar 2, 2019; 2:00 pm, ESPN+		at Louisiana–Monroe	W 97–91	14–14 (8–8)	Fant–Ewing Coliseum (2,936); Monroe, LA
Mar 7, 2019; 7:00 pm, ESPN+		South Alabama	W 92–70	15–14 (9–8)	HTC Center (1,037); Conway, SC
Mar 9, 2019; 2:00 pm, ESPN+		Troy	L 67–74	15–15 (9–9)	HTC Center (1,099); Conway, SC
Sun Belt tournament
Mar 14, 2019; 7:30 pm, ESPN+	(6)	vs. (7) Louisiana–Monroe; Second round	L 50–80	15–16	Lakefront Arena; New Orleans, LA
College Basketball Invitational
Mar 20, 2019*; 7:00 pm, ESPN+		Howard; First Round	W 81–72	16–16	HTC Center (779); Conway, SC
Mar 25, 2019*; 7:00 pm		at West Virginia; Quarterfinals	W 109–91	17–16	WVU Coliseum (6,775); Morgantown, WV
Mar 27, 2019*; 8:00 pm		at DePaul; Semifinals	L 87–92	17–17	McGrath–Phillips Arena (939); Chicago, IL
*Non-conference game. ^{#}Rankings from AP Poll. (#) Tournament seedings in parentheses. All times are in Eastern Time Source:.
