= 2018–19 Texas State Bobcats men's basketball team =

American college basketball season

2018–19 Texas State Bobcats men's basketball

CIT, First round
- Conference: Sun Belt Conference
- Record: 24–10 (12–6 Sun Belt)
- Head coach: Danny Kaspar (6th season)
- Assistant coaches: Jim Shaw; Robert Guster; Terrence Johnson
- Home arena: Strahan Coliseum

2018–19 Sun Belt Conference men's basketball standings
	Conf.				Overall
Team	W		L	PCT	W		L	PCT
Georgia State †	13	–	5	.722	24	–	10	.706
UT Arlington	12	–	6	.667	17	–	16	.515
Georgia Southern	12	–	6	.667	21	–	12	.636
Texas State	12	–	6	.667	24	–	10	.706
Louisiana	10	–	8	.556	19	–	13	.594
Coastal Carolina	9	–	9	.500	17	–	17	.500
Louisiana–Monroe	9	–	9	.500	19	–	16	.543
South Alabama	8	–	10	.444	17	–	17	.500
Arkansas State	7	–	11	.389	13	–	19	.406
Appalachian State	6	–	12	.333	11	–	21	.344
Little Rock	5	–	13	.278	10	–	21	.323
Troy	5	–	13	.278	12	–	18	.400
† 2019 Sun Belt Conference tournament winner

The 2018–19 Texas State Bobcats men's basketball team represented Texas State University in the 2018–19 NCAA Division I men's basketball season. The Bobcats, led by sixth-year head coach Danny Kaspar, played their home games at Strahan Coliseum in San Marcos, Texas as members of the Sun Belt Conference. They lost in the semifinals of the Sun Belt tournament to Georgia State.

== Previous season ==
The Bobcats finished the 2017-2018 season 15–18, 7–11 in Sun Belt play to finish in a tie for ninth place. As the No. 9 seed in the Sun Belt tournament, they defeated Coastal Carolina before losing to Louisiana in the quarterfinals.

== Roster ==
2018–19 Texas State Bobcats men's basketball team
Players
Coaches

Pos.	#	Name	Height	Weight	Year	Hometown
G	0	Isaiah Gurley	6 ft 3 in (1.91 m)	195 lb (88 kg)	Sr	Brooklyn, New York
G	1	Dillon Gooding	5 ft 11 in (1.8 m)	150 lb (68 kg)	Fr	Killeen, Texas
G	2	Tre'Larenz Nottingham	6 ft 2 in (1.88 m)	185 lb (84 kg)	Sr	Moreno Valley, California
F	3	Chandler Davis	6 ft 8 in (2.03 m)	235 lb (107 kg)	Jr	Conyers, Georgia
G	4	Shelby Adams	6 ft 3 in (1.91 m)	175 lb (79 kg)	So	Converse, Texas
G	5	Marlin Davis	6 ft 2 in (1.88 m)	165 lb (75 kg)	Jr	Houston, Texas
G	10	Nathan McClure	6 ft 4 in (1.93 m)	165 lb (75 kg)	Fr	Tomball, Texas
G	12	Mason Harrell	5 ft 9 in (1.75 m)	145 lb (66 kg)	Fr	Midwest City, Oklahoma
F	14	Quentin Scott	6 ft 7 in (2.01 m)	215 lb (98 kg)	So	Houma, Louisiana
G	22	Nijal Pearson	6 ft 5 in (1.96 m)	200 lb (91 kg)	Jr	Beaumont, Texas
F	23	Alex Peacock	6 ft 7 in (2.01 m)	215 lb (98 kg)	Sr	Bloomington, Illinois
F	23	Akiem Daschner	6 ft 7 in (2.01 m)	205 lb (93 kg)	So	Lake Worth, Florida
F	25	Alonzo Sule	6 ft 8 in (2.03 m)	200 lb (91 kg)	RS Fr	Houston, Texas
G	35	Jaylen Shead	6 ft 1 in (1.85 m)	190 lb (86 kg)	RS Jr	Pflugerville, Texas
F	45	Eric Terry	6 ft 8 in (2.03 m)	230 lb (104 kg)	RS Jr	Houston, Texas
F	55	Nedeljko Prijovic	6 ft 8 in (2.03 m)	210 lb (95 kg)	So	Belgrade, Serbia

Head coach

- Danny Kaspar (North Texas)

Assistant coach(es)

- Jim Shaw (Grinnell)
- Terrence Johnson (Southern)
- Robert Guster (Missouri–Rolla)

Legend

- (C) Team captain
- (S) Suspended
- (I) Ineligible
- (W) Walk-on
- Injured
- Current redshirt

Roster
Last update: January 3, 2019

== Schedule ==
Date time, TV	Rank^{#}	Opponent^{#}	Result	Record	High points	High rebounds	High assists	Site (attendance) city, state
Non-conference regular season
Nov 9, 2018*; 7:00 pm, ESPN+		Air Force	W 67–57	1–0	21 – Pearson	5 – Terry	5 – Pearson	Strahan Coliseum (4,058); San Marcos, TX
Nov 13, 2018*; 7:00 pm, ESPN+		Hardin–Simmons	W 97–52	2–0	17 – Terry	12 – Peacock	6 – Shead	Strahan Coliseum (1,118); San Marcos, TX
Nov 17, 2018*; 3:00 pm, ESPN3		at Drake	L 69–75	2–1	19 – Pearson	9 – Peacock	4 – Shead	Knapp Center (2,968); Des Moines, IA
Nov 21, 2018*; 6:30 pm		vs. Cal Poly; Portland Classic	W 54–42	3–1	22 – Pearson	11 – Peacock	7 – Nottingham	Chiles Center (1,249); Portland, OR
Nov 23, 2018*; 6:30 pm		vs. USC Upstate; Portland Classic	W 82–50	4–1	25 – Nottingham	7 – Shead	5 – Peacock	Chiles Center (1,320); Portland, OR
Nov 24, 2018*; 7:00 pm		at Portland; Portland Classic	W 91–68	5–1	33 – Pearson	7 – Peacock	6 – Harrell	Chiles Center (1,303); Portland, OR
Nov 28, 2018*; 7:00 pm, ESPN+		Rice	W 74–60	6–1	25 – Pearson	7 – Peacock	9 – Shead	Strahan Coliseum (1,897); San Marcos, TX
Dec 1, 2018*; 3:00 pm		at UTSA; I-35 Rivalry	W 69–68	7–1	26 – Pearson	8 – Shead	8 – Shead	Convocation Center (1,329); San Antonio, TX
Dec 5, 2018*; 7:00 pm		at Texas A&M–Corpus Christi	W 61–55	8–1	22 – Sule	9 – Peacock	6 – Nottingham	American Bank Center (1,225); Corpus Christi, TX
Dec 8, 2018*; 4:00 pm, ESPN+		Houston Baptist	W 90–80	9–1	23 – Sule	10 – Sule	4 – 3 tied	Strahan Coliseum (2,103); San Marcos, TX
Dec 15, 2018*; 7:00 pm, ESPN+		at Texas–Rio Grande Valley	W 77–68	10–1	19 – Nottingham	10 – Shead	5 – Tied	UTRGV Fieldhouse (733); Edinburg, TX
Dec 22, 2018*; 1:00 pm, SECN		at Arkansas	L 70–73	10–2	18 – Nottingham	8 – Tied	4 – Shead	Bud Walton Arena (13,463); Fayetteville, AR
Dec 29, 2018*; 4:00 pm		Howard Payne	W 105–29	11–2	22 – Pearson	10 – Adams	8 – Shead	Strahan Coliseum (1,643); San Marcos, TX
Sun Belt regular season
Jan 5, 2019; 7:00 pm, ESPN+		Georgia Southern	W 73–70	12–2 (1–0)	24 – Nottingham	14 – Pearson	7 – Shead	Strahan Coliseum (1,517); San Marcos, TX
Jan 5, 2019; 4:00 pm, ESPN+		Georgia State	L 69–73	12–3 (1–1)	17 – Nottingham	9 – Peacock	6 – Peacock	Strahan Coliseum (1,437); San Marcos, TX
Jan 10, 2019; 6:00 pm, ESPN+		at Coastal Carolina	W 65–61	13–3 (2–1)	13 – Peacock	10 – Sule	4 – Shead	HTC Center (836); Conway, South Carolina
Jan 12, 2019; 1:00 pm		at Appalachian State	W 70–69	14–3 (3–1)	16 – Tied	6 – 3 tied	4 – Tied	Holmes Center (953); Boone, North Carolina
Jan 17, 2019; 7:00 pm, ESPN+		Little Rock	W 80–62	15–3 (4–1)	24 – Nottingham	7 – Sule	5 – Shead	Strahan Coliseum (2,107); San Marcos, TX
Jan 5, 2019; 4:00 pm, ESPN+		Arkansas State	W 77–64	16–3 (5–1)	29 – Pearson	11 – Pearson	3 – Shead	Strahan Coliseum (4,163); San Marcos, TX
Jan 24, 2019; 6:00 pm, ESPN+		at Georgia State	W 81–68	17–3 (6–1)	27 – Pearson	8 – Nottingham	8 – Shead	GSU Sports Arena (1,984); Atlanta, GA
Jan 26, 2019; 4:00 pm		at Georgia Southern	L 58–74	17–4 (6–2)	25 – Nottingham	6 – Tied	4 – Shead	Hanner Fieldhouse (2,414); Statesboro, GA
Feb 2, 2019; 4:00 pm, ESPN+		UT Arlington	L 77–84 ^{2OT}	17–5 (6–3)	15 – Pearson	10 – Terry	7 – Shead	Strahan Coliseum (6,581); San Marcos, TX
Feb 7, 2019; 4:00 pm, ESPN+		Appalachian State	W 74–71	18–5 (7–3)	19 – Pearson	5 – Pearson	4 – Nottingham	Strahan Coliseum (4,517); San Marcos, TX
Feb 9, 2019; 4:00 pm, ESPN+		Coastal Carolina	W 65–57	19–5 (8–3)	17 – Pearson	8 – Peacock	6 – Shead	Strahan Coliseum (4,583); San Marcos, TX
Feb 14, 2019; 7:00 pm, ESPN+		at Arkansas State	W 84–74	20–5 (9–3)	21 – Pearson	10 – Sule	5 – Shead	First National Bank Arena (1,264); Jonesboro, AR
Feb 16, 2019; 3:00 pm, ESPN+		at Little Rock	W 67–60	21–5 (10–3)	23 – Pearson	6 – Nottingham	4 – Shead	Jack Stephens Center (1,677); Little Rock, AR
Feb 21, 2019; 7:00 pm, ESPN+		Louisiana–Monroe	L 60–63	21–6 (10–4)	22 – Nottingham	10 – Terry	5 – Shead	Strahan Coliseum (4,342); San Marcos, TX
Feb 23, 2019; 4:00 pm, ESPN+		Louisiana	W 64–62	22–6 (11–4)	17 – Nottingham	10 – Sule	3 – Pearson	Strahan Coliseum (4,706); San Marcos, TX
Feb 28, 2019; 6:00 pm, ESPN+		at Troy	W 58–44	23–6 (12–4)	15 – Pearson	6 – Pearson	4 – Harrell	Trojan Arena (2,649); Troy, AL
Mar 2, 2019; 7:00 pm, ESPN+		at South Alabama	L 63–77	23–7 (12–5)	20 – Peacock	6 – Peacock	7 – Shead	Mitchell Center (1,811); Mobile, AL
Mar 9, 2019; 2:00 pm, ESPN+		at UT Arlington	L 73–81	23–8 (12–6)	13 – Harrell	7 – Shead	7 – Shead	College Park Center (2,702); Arlington, TX
Sun Belt tournament
Mar 15, 2019; 5:00 pm, ESPN+	(4)	vs. (8) South Alabama; Quarterfinals	W 79–67	24–8	19 – Nottingham	9 – Peacock	7 – Shead	Lakefront Arena; New Orleans, LA
Mar 16, 2019; 3:00 pm, ESPN+	(4)	vs. (1) Georgia State; Semifinals	L 46–59	24–9	13 – Nottingham	9 – Pearson	3 – Shead	Lakefront Arena; New Orleans, LA
CollegeInsider.com Postseason tournament
Mar 23, 2019*; 6:00 pm		FIU; First round	L 81–87	24–10	27 – Nottingham	9 – Adams	3 – Shead	Strahan Coliseum (1,237); San Marcos, TX
*Non-conference game. ^{#}Rankings from AP Poll. (#) Tournament seedings in parentheses. All times are in Central Time.
