= 2018–19 Troy Trojans men's basketball team =

American college basketball season

2018–19 Troy Trojans men's basketball
- Conference: Sun Belt Conference
- Record: 12–18 (5–13 Sun Belt)
- Head coach: Phil Cunningham (6th season)
- Assistant coaches: Marcus Grant; Ben Fletcher; Mike Worley
- Home arena: Trojan Arena (Capacity 6,000)

2018–19 Sun Belt Conference men's basketball standings
| | Conf. | | | | Overall |
| Team | W | | L | PCT | W | | L | PCT |
|---|---|---|---|---|---|---|---|---|
| Georgia State † | 13 | – | 5 | .722 | 24 | – | 10 | .706 |
| UT Arlington | 12 | – | 6 | .667 | 17 | – | 16 | .515 |
| Georgia Southern | 12 | – | 6 | .667 | 21 | – | 12 | .636 |
| Texas State | 12 | – | 6 | .667 | 24 | – | 10 | .706 |
| Louisiana | 10 | – | 8 | .556 | 19 | – | 13 | .594 |
| Coastal Carolina | 9 | – | 9 | .500 | 17 | – | 17 | .500 |
| Louisiana–Monroe | 9 | – | 9 | .500 | 19 | – | 16 | .543 |
| South Alabama | 8 | – | 10 | .444 | 17 | – | 17 | .500 |
| Arkansas State | 7 | – | 11 | .389 | 13 | – | 19 | .406 |
| Appalachian State | 6 | – | 12 | .333 | 11 | – | 21 | .344 |
| Little Rock | 5 | – | 13 | .278 | 10 | – | 21 | .323 |
| Troy | 5 | – | 13 | .278 | 12 | – | 18 | .400 |
† 2019 Sun Belt Conference tournament winner

The 2018–19 Troy Trojans men's basketball team represented Troy University during the 2018–19 NCAA Division I men's basketball season. The Trojans, led by sixth-year head coach Phil Cunningham, played their home games at Trojan Arena in Troy, Alabama as members of the Sun Belt Conference.

== Previous season ==
The Trojans finished the 2017–18 season 16–17, 9–9 in Sun Belt play to finish in a three-way tie for fifth place. They defeated South Alabama in the first round of the Sun Belt tournament before losing in the quarterfinals to Georgia State.

== Roster ==
2018–19 Troy Trojans men's basketball team
Players
Coaches

| Pos. | # | Name | Height | Weight | Year | Hometown |
|---|---|---|---|---|---|---|
| F | 0 | Devante Foster | 6 ft 8 in (2.03 m) | 195 lb (88 kg) | Jr | Stockbridge, Georgia |
| F | 1 | Javan Johnson | 6 ft 7 in (2.01 m) | 198 lb (90 kg) | So | Decatur, Alabama |
| G | 2 | KJ Simon | 6 ft 3 in (1.91 m) | 190 lb (86 kg) | Fr | Orlando, Florida |
| G | 3 | Darian Adams | 6 ft 3 in (1.91 m) | 200 lb (91 kg) | RS So | Montgomery, Alabama |
| G | 5 | Malki Burnett | 6 ft 2 in (1.88 m) | 185 lb (84 kg) | So | Huntsville, Alabama |
| F | 10 | Zay Williams | 6 ft 8 in (2.03 m) | 185 lb (84 kg) | Fr | Birmingham, Alabama |
| G | 11 | BJ Miller | 6 ft 1 in (1.85 m) | 190 lb (86 kg) | Sr | Meridian, Mississippi |
| G | 12 | Charles Norman | 6 ft 2 in (1.88 m) | 180 lb (82 kg) | Jr | Durham, North Carolina |
| G | 13 | Jalen Tuck | 5 ft 10 in (1.78 m) | 185 lb (84 kg) | Fr | Troy, Alabama |
| G/F | 15 | Atakan Sahinkaya | 6 ft 5 in (1.96 m) | 205 lb (93 kg) | RS Fr | Istanbul, Turkey |
| G | 21 | Eric Walker | 6 ft 4 in (1.93 m) | 190 lb (86 kg) | Fr | Birmingham, Alabama |
| G | 22 | Spencer Rodgers | 6 ft 4 in (1.93 m) | 180 lb (82 kg) | Fr | Buford, Georgia |
| F | 23 | Jordon Varnado | 6 ft 6 in (1.98 m) | 230 lb (104 kg) | Sr | Brownsville, Tennessee |
| F | 30 | Alex Hicks | 6 ft 8 in (2.03 m) | 215 lb (98 kg) | Sr | Seale, Alabama |
| F | 35 | Davion Thomas | 6 ft 9 in (2.06 m) | 210 lb (95 kg) | RS So | Columbus, Georgia |

Head coach

- Phil Cunningham (Campbellsville)

Assistant coach(es)

- Marcus Grant (Mississippi State)
- Ben Fletcher (Troy)
- Mike Worley (Denver)

Legend

- (C) Team captain
- (S) Suspended
- (I) Ineligible
- (W) Walk-on
- Injured
- Current redshirt

Roster
Last update: January 4, 2019

== Schedule and results ==
| Date time, TV | Rank^{#} | Opponent^{#} | Result | Record | Site (attendance) city, state |
Non-conference regular season
| Nov 6, 2018*; 7:00 pm | | Fort Valley State | W 95–60 | 1–0 | Trojan Arena (2,562); Troy, AL |
| Nov 10, 2018*; 7:00 pm | | at Saint Louis; Barclays Center Classic | L 58–62 | 1–1 | Chaifetz Arena (6,523); St. Louis, Missouri |
| Nov 12, 2018*; 6:00 pm, ACCN Extra | | at Pittsburgh; Barclays Center Classic | W 75–64 | 1–2 | Petersen Events Center (3,285); Pittsburgh, PA |
| Nov 15, 2018*; 6:00 pm, ESPN+ | | Southern Miss | L 66–81 | 1–3 | Troy Arena (3,007); Troy, AL |
| Nov 18, 2018*; 2:00 pm | | Central Arkansas; Barclays Center Classic | W 82–77 | 2–3 | Troy Arena (1,312); Troy, AL |
| Nov 24, 2018*; 11:30 am | | North Alabama; Barclays Center Classic | W 77–58 | 3–3 | Troy Arena (1,423); Troy, AL |
| Nov 29, 2018*; 7:15 pm, ESPN+ | | Austin Peay | L 74–79 ^{OT} | 3–4 | Troy Arena (2,761); Troy, AL |
| Dec 3, 2018*; 7:15 pm, ACCN Extra | | at No. 11 Florida State | L 67–83 | 3–5 | Donald L. Tucker Civic Center (7,838); Tallahassee, FL |
| Dec 12, 2018*; 2:15 pm | | Carver College | W 88–43 | 4–5 | Troy Arena (1,512); Troy, AL |
| Dec 16, 2018*; 2:00 pm, ESPN3 | | at Western Kentucky | W 87–81 | 5–5 | E. A. Diddle Arena (5,285); Bowling Green, KY |
| Dec 21, 2018*; 7:00 pm | | at UAB | W 74–73 | 6–5 | Bartow Arena (3,212); Birmingham, AL |
| Dec 29, 2018*; 12:00 pm | | Arkansas–Pine Bluff | W 71–63 | 7–5 | Troy Arena (1,887); Troy, AL |
Sun Belt Conference regular season
| Jan 3, 2019; 6:00 pm, ESPN+ | | Coastal Carolina | L 75–88 | 7–6 (0–1) | Trojan Arena (2,131); Troy, AL |
| Jan 5, 2019; 2:00 pm, ESPN+ | | Appalachian State | W 89–85 | 8–6 (1–1) | Trojan Arena (1,902); Troy, AL |
| Jan 10, 2019; 6:30 pm, ESPN+ | | at Little Rock | L 59–73 | 8–7 (1–2) | Jack Stephens Center (1,318); Little Rock, AR |
| Jan 12, 2019; 7:00 pm, ESPN+ | | at Arkansas State | W 90–85 ^{OT} | 9–7 (2–2) | First National Bank Arena (1,802); Jonesboro, AR |
| Jan 17, 2019; 6:00 pm, ESPN+ | | Georgia Southern | L 82–90 | 9–8 (2–3) | Trojan Arena (3,021); Troy, AL |
| Jan 19, 2019; 2:00 pm, ESPN+ | | Georgia State | W 77–75 | 10–8 (3–3) | Trojan Arena (3,117); Troy, AL |
| Jan 24, 2019; 7:00 pm, ESPN+ | | at Louisiana–Monroe | L 69–75 | 10–9 (3–4) | Fant–Ewing Coliseum (5,107); Monroe, LA |
| Jan 26, 2019; 7:00 pm, ESPN+ | | at Louisiana | L 81–86 | 10–10 (3–5) | Cajundome (4,068); Lafayette, LA |
| Feb 2, 2019; 5:00 pm, ESPN+ | | at South Alabama | L 75–81 | 10–11 (3–6) | Mitchell Center (4,469); Mobile, AL |
| Feb 7, 2019; 6:00 pm, ESPN+ | | Little Rock | L 70—84 | 10—12 (3—7) | Trojan Arena (3,228); Troy, AL |
| Feb 9, 2019; 2:00 pm, ESPN+ | | Arkansas State | W 84-79 | 11-12 (4-7) | Trojan Arena (2,214); Troy, AL |
| Feb 13, 2019; 6:00 pm, ESPN+ | | at Georgia State | L 63-77 | 11-12 (4-8) | GSU Sports Arena (1,426); Atlanta, GA |
| Feb 15, 2019; 8:00 pm, ESPN2 | | at Georgia Southern | L 51-76 | 11-14 (4-9) | Hanner Fieldhouse (2,349); Statesboro, GA |
| Feb 23, 2019; 4:15 pm, ESPN+ | | South Alabama | L 52-68 | 11-15 (4-10) | Trojan Arena (3,049); Troy, AL |
| Feb 28, 2019; 6:00 pm, ESPN+ | | Texas State | L 44-58 | 11-16 (4-11) | Trojan Arena (2,649); Troy, AL |
| Mar 2, 2019; 2:00 pm, ESPN+ | | UT Arlington | L 66-79 | 11-17 (4-12) | Trojan Arena (2,112); Troy, AL |
| Mar 7, 2019; 6:00 pm, ESPN+ | | at Appalachian State | L 64-72 | 11-18 (4-13) | Holmes Center (572); Boone, North Carolina |
| Mar 9, 2019; 1:00 pm, ESPN+ | | at Coastal Carolina | W 74-67 | 12-18 (5-13) | HTC Center (1,099); Conway, SC |
*Non-conference game. ^{#}Rankings from AP Poll. (#) Tournament seedings in parentheses. All times are in Central Time.
