= 2018–19 South Alabama Jaguars men's basketball team =

American college basketball season

2018–19 South Alabama Jaguars men's basketball
- Conference: Sun Belt Conference
- Record: 17–17 (8–10 Sun Belt)
- Head coach: Richie Riley (1st season)
- Assistant coaches: Adam Howard; Amorrow Morgan; Nima Omidvar
- Home arena: Mitchell Center

2018–19 Sun Belt Conference men's basketball standings
	Conf.				Overall
Team	W		L	PCT	W		L	PCT
Georgia State †	13	–	5	.722	24	–	10	.706
UT Arlington	12	–	6	.667	17	–	16	.515
Georgia Southern	12	–	6	.667	21	–	12	.636
Texas State	12	–	6	.667	24	–	10	.706
Louisiana	10	–	8	.556	19	–	13	.594
Coastal Carolina	9	–	9	.500	17	–	17	.500
Louisiana–Monroe	9	–	9	.500	19	–	16	.543
South Alabama	8	–	10	.444	17	–	17	.500
Arkansas State	7	–	11	.389	13	–	19	.406
Appalachian State	6	–	12	.333	11	–	21	.344
Little Rock	5	–	13	.278	10	–	21	.323
Troy	5	–	13	.278	12	–	18	.400
† 2019 Sun Belt Conference tournament winner

The 2018–19 South Alabama Jaguars men's basketball team represented the University of South Alabama during the 2018–19 NCAA Division I men's basketball season. The Jaguars were led by first-year head coach Richie Riley and played their home games at the Mitchell Center in Mobile, Alabama as members in the Sun Belt Conference.

== Previous season ==
The Jaguars finished the 2017–18 season 14–18, 7–11 in Sun Belt play, to finish in ninth place. They lost to Troy in the first round of the Sun Belt tournament.

== Off-season ==
=== Departures ===
Name	Pos.	Height	Weight	Year	Hometown	Notes
Dederick Lee	G	6'0"	162	Senior	Clarksville, AR	Graduated
Devin Epps	G	5'11"	167	Senior	Murfreesboro, TN	Graduated
Nick Davis	F	6'6"	191	Senior	Mt. Vernon, AL	Graduated
Rozelle Nix	F	6'11"	330	Senior	Cincinnati, OH	Graduated
Ethan Haslam	G	6'4"	190	Freshman	Lithia, FL	Transferred to Berry
A.J. Caldwell	G	6'4"	190	Freshman	Sarasota, FL	Transferred to Chattanooga
Joe Thompson	F	6'7"	211	Freshman	Kenner, LA	Left program

=== Incoming transfers ===
Name	Number	Pos.	Height	Weight	Year	Hometown	Previous school
Josh Ayeni		F	6'8"	215	Junior	Zaria, Nigeria	Transferred from St. Bonaventure. Under NCAA transfer rules, Ayeni will have to sit out for the 2018–19 season. Will have two years of remaining eligibility.
Don Coleman		G	6'2"	190	Senior	Augusta, GA	Transferred from California. Under NCAA transfer rules, Coleman will have to sit out for the 2018–19 season. Will have one year of remaining eligibility.
Andre Fox		G	6'3"	190	Senior	Greenbelt, MD	Transferred from High Point. Under NCAA transfer rules, Nix will have to sit out for the 2018–19 season. Will have one year of remaining eligibility.
Kory Holden	0	G	6'2"	185	Senior	Salisbury, MD	Graduate transfer from South Carolina. Under NCAA transfer rules, Holden will play immediately in the 2018–19 season. Will have one year of remaining eligibility.
Tashombe Riley	2	F	6'7"	210	Senior	Orangeburg, SC	Graduate transfer from South Carolina State. Under NCAA transfer rules, Riley will play immediately in the 2018–19 season. Will have one year of remaining eligibility.
Abdul Dial	30	G	6'3"	200	Junior	West Palm Beach, FL	Junior college transfer from Mississippi Gulf Coast Community College. Under NCAA transfer rules, Dial will play immediately in the 2018–19 season. Will have two year of remaining eligibility.

== Roster ==
2018–19 South Alabama Jaguars men's basketball team
Players
Coaches

Pos.	#	Name	Height	Weight	Year	Previous school	Hometown
F		Josh Ayeni (redshirt)	6 ft 8 in (2.03 m)	215 lb (98 kg)	Jr	St. Bonaventure	Zaria, Nigeria
G		Don Coleman (redshirt)	6 ft 2 in (1.88 m)	190 lb (86 kg)	GS	California	Augusta, GA
G		Andre Fox (redshirt)	6 ft 3 in (1.91 m)	190 lb (86 kg)	GS	High Point	Greenbelt, MD
G	0	Kory Holden	6 ft 2 in (1.88 m)	185 lb (84 kg)	GS	South Carolina	Salisbury, MD
G	1	Herb McGee	6 ft 2 in (1.88 m)	195 lb (88 kg)	Jr	Riverside Academy	Reserve, LA
F	2	Tashombe Riley	6 ft 7 in (2.01 m)	210 lb (95 kg)	GS	South Carolina State	Orangeburg, SC
F	3	Kevin Morris	6 ft 8 in (2.03 m)	248 lb (112 kg)	Jr	Dothan High School	Dothan, AL
F	12	RJ Kelly	6 ft 7 in (2.01 m)	205 lb (93 kg)	RS So	Savannah State	Powder Springs, GA
G	14	Rodrick Sikes	6 ft 2 in (1.88 m)	170 lb (77 kg)	Sr	St. Martin High School	Ocean Springs, MS
G	25	Jordan Andrews	6 ft 5 in (1.96 m)	180 lb (82 kg)	RS Jr	Youngstown State	Abita Springs, LA
G	30	Abdul Dial	6 ft 3 in (1.91 m)	200 lb (91 kg)	Jr	Mississippi Gulf Coast Community College	West Palm Beach, FL
F	33	Josh Ajayi	6 ft 7 in (2.01 m)	245 lb (111 kg)	RS Jr	San Gabriel Academy	El Monte, CA
F	42	Trhae Mitchell	6 ft 6 in (1.98 m)	195 lb (88 kg)	RS Jr	Pebblebrook High School	Austell, GA
G	50	John Pettway	6 ft 2 in (1.88 m)	193 lb (88 kg)	RS So	Keith High School	Safford, AL

Head coach

- Richie Riley (Eastern Kentucky)

Assistant coach(es)

- Adam Howard (Western Kentucky)
- Amorrow Morgan (Idaho State)
- Nima Omidvar (Maryland)

Legend

- (C) Team captain
- (S) Suspended
- (I) Ineligible
- (W) Walk-on
- Injured
- Current redshirt

Roster
Last update: May 30, 2024

== Schedule and results ==
Date time, TV	Rank^{#}	Opponent^{#}	Result	Record	High points	High rebounds	High assists	Site (attendance) city, state
Exhibition
October 27, 2018*; 4:00 p.m.		Tuskegee	W 63–40	–	13 – Sikes	8 – Kelly	4 – McGee	Mitchell Center (1,714); Mobile, AL
Non-conference regular season
November 6, 2018*; 8:00 p.m., SECN		at No. 11 Auburn	L 58–101	0–1	25 – Sikes	5 – tied	3 – McGee	Auburn Arena (7,754); Auburn, AL
November 11, 2018*; 4:00 p.m., ESPN+		Huntingdon	W 106–76	1–1	23 – Dial	9 – tied	10 – Mitchell	Mitchell Center (1,562); Mobile, AL
November 16, 2018*; 7:00 p.m.		Chattanooga; Goldie and Herman Ungar Classic	W 73–54	2–1	23 – Ajayi	12 – Ajayi	3 – McGee	Mitchell Center (1,585); Mobile, AL
November 17, 2018*; 7:00 p.m.		Jacksonville; Goldie and Herman Ungar Classic	L 48–71	2–2	16 – McGee	8 – tied	2 – MGee	Mitchell Center (1,605); Mobile, AL
November 19, 2018*; 7:00 p.m., ESPN+		Southeast Missouri State; Goldie and Herman Ungar Classic	W 79–58	3–2	30 – Sikes	9 – Mitchell	11 – McGee	Mitchell Center (1,482); Mobile, AL
November 23, 2018*; 6:30 p.m., SECN+		at Texas A&M	L 62–74	3–3	21 – Sikes	5 – Ajayi	4 – tied	Reed Arena (8,569); College Station, TX
November 28, 2018*; 7:00 p.m.		at Southern Miss	L 67–71	3–4	28 – Holden	7 – Mitchell	4 – McGee	Reed Green Coliseum; Hattiesburg, MS
December 1, 2018*; 7:00 p.m., ESPN+		Florida A&M	W 66–57	4–4	18 – Sikes	15 – Ajayi	4 – tied	Mitchell Center (2,114); Mobile, AL
December 5, 2018*; 7:00 p.m.		at New Orleans	L 61–70	4–5	20 – Mitchell	8 – Mitchell	3 – McGee	Lakefront Arena (505); New Orleans, LA
December 8, 2018*; 3:00 p.m., ESPN+		Tulane	W 81–60	5–5	21 – Sikes	10 – Ajayi	6 – Kelly	Mitchell Center (1,565); Mobile, AL
December 19, 2018*; 7:00 p.m., ESPN+		Alabama A&M	W 79–67	6–5	20 – Ajayi	13 – Mitchell	9 – Mitchell	Mitchell Center (1,732); Mobile, AL
December 20, 2018*; 7:00 p.m., ESPN+		Mobile	W 86–47	7–5	28 – Mitchell	11 – Ajayi	7 – Pettway	Mitchell Center (1,671); Mobile, AL
December 29, 2018*; 3:00 p.m., ESPN+		Richmond	L 82–91	7–6	25 – Ajayi	6 – tied	6 – Holden	Mitchell Center (1,523); Mobile, AL
Regular season
January 3, 2019; 7:00 p.m., ESPN+		Appalachian State	W 79–73	8–6 (1–0)	21 – Sikes	12 – Ajayi	8 – Ajayi	Mitchell Center (1,729); Mobile, AL
January 5, 2019; 3:00 p.m., ESPN+		Coastal Carolina	W 84–77 ^{2OT}	9–6 (2–0)	22 – Mitchell	11 – Mitchell	7 – Mitchell	Mitchell Center (2,091); Mobile, AL
January 10, 2019; 7:00 p.m.		at Arkansas State	L 65–66	9–7 (2–1)	24 – Sikes	7 – tied	3 – Ajayi	First National Bank Arena (1,374); Jonesboro, AR
January 12, 2019; 3:00 p.m.		at Little Rock	L 62–91	9–8 (2–2)	22 – Mitchell	6 – Mitchell	4 – Holden	Jack Stephens Center (1,565); Little Rock, AR
January 17, 2019; 7:00 p.m., ESPN+		Georgia State	L 66–69	9–9 (2–3)	24 – Ajayi	11 – Ajayi	7 – Holden	Mitchell Center (1,985); Mobile, AL
January 19, 2019; 3:00 p.m., ESPN+		Georgia Southern	L 86–88 ^{OT}	9–10 (2–4)	26 – Ajayi	11 – tied	4 – Mitchell	Mitchell Center (1,885); Mobile, AL
January 24, 2019; 7:00 p.m.		at Louisiana	L 84–88	9–11 (2–5)	31 – Mitchell	12 – tied	3 – tied	Cajundome (3,847); Lafayette, LA
January 26, 2019; 2:00 p.m.		at Louisiana–Monroe	W 78–72	10–11 (3–5)	23 – Mitchell	8 – Ajayi	4 – McGee	Fant–Ewing Coliseum (5,206); Monroe, LA
February 2, 2019; 5:00 p.m., ESPN+		Troy	W 81–75	11–11 (4–5)	17 – Mitchell	10 – Ajayi	5 – Mitchell	Mitchell Center (4,469); Mobile, AL
February 7, 2019; 7:00 p.m., ESPN+		Arkansas State	W 70–62	12–11 (5–5)	24 – McGee	10 – Mitchell	7 – Mitchell	Mitchell Center (1,785); Mobile, AL
February 9, 2019; 3:00 p.m., ESPN+		Little Rock	L 68–73	12–12 (5–6)	19 – Sikes	9 – Mitchell	4 – Pettway	Mitchell Center (2,193); Mobile, AL
February 13, 2019; 6:00 p.m.		at Georgia Southern	L 65–75	12–13 (5–7)	18 – McGee	7 – Mitchell	4 – Mitchell	Hanner Fieldhouse (1,321); Statesboro, GA
February 15, 2019; 6:00 p.m.		at Georgia State	L 81–90	12–14 (5–8)	26 – McGee	12 – Mitchell	8 – McGee	GSU Sports Arena (1,531); Atlanta, GA
February 23, 2019; 4:15 p.m.		at Troy	W 68–52	13–14 (6–8)	18 – Ajayi	14 – Mitchell	5 – Mitchell	Trojan Arena (3,049); Troy, AL
February 28, 2019; 7:00 p.m., ESPN+		UT Arlington	L 57–75	13–15 (6–9)	18 – Ajayi	10 – Ajayi	3 – Ajayi	Mitchell Center (1,813); Mobile, AL
March 2, 2019; 7:00 p.m., ESPN+		Texas State	W 77–63	14–15 (7–9)	20 – Ajayi	9 – Mitchell	3 – Mitchell	Mitchell Center (1,811); Mobile, AL
March 7, 2019; 6:00 p.m.		at Coastal Carolina	L 70–92	14–16 (7–10)	22 – Mitchell	6 – McGee	5 – McGee	HTC Center (1,037); Conway, SC
March 9, 2019; 1:00 p.m.		at Appalachian State	W 78–71	15–16 (8–10)	26 – Ajayi	11 – Mitchell	7 – McGee	Holmes Center (1,104); Boone, NC
Sun Belt tournament
March 12, 2019; 7:00 p.m.	(8)	(9) Arkansas State; First round	W 75–67	16–16	22 – Ajayi	13 – Mitchell	6 – McGee	Mitchell Center (1,624); Mobile, AL
March 14, 2019; 5:00 p.m.	(8)	vs. (5) Louisiana; Second round	W 70–69	17–16	25 – Ajayi	7 – Ajayi	6 – Mitchell	Lakefront Arena; New Orleans, LA
March 15, 2019; 5:00 p.m.	(8)	vs. (4) Texas State; Quarterfinals	L 67–79	17–17	25 – McGee	5 – Kelly	4 – McGee	Lakefront Arena; New Orleans, LA
*Non-conference game. ^{#}Rankings from AP poll. (#) Tournament seedings in parentheses. All times are in Central Time.

== See also ==
- 2018–19 South Alabama Jaguars women's basketball team
