= 2018–19 UT Arlington Mavericks men's basketball team =

American college basketball season

2018–19 UT Arlington Mavericks men's basketball
- Conference: Sun Belt Conference
- Record: 17–16 (12–6 Sun Belt)
- Head coach: Chris Ogden (1st season)
- Assistant coaches: Greg Young; Riley Davis; Royce Johnson
- Home arena: College Park Center

2018–19 Sun Belt Conference men's basketball standings
	Conf.				Overall
Team	W		L	PCT	W		L	PCT
Georgia State †	13	–	5	.722	24	–	10	.706
UT Arlington	12	–	6	.667	17	–	16	.515
Georgia Southern	12	–	6	.667	21	–	12	.636
Texas State	12	–	6	.667	24	–	10	.706
Louisiana	10	–	8	.556	19	–	13	.594
Coastal Carolina	9	–	9	.500	17	–	17	.500
Louisiana–Monroe	9	–	9	.500	19	–	16	.543
South Alabama	8	–	10	.444	17	–	17	.500
Arkansas State	7	–	11	.389	13	–	19	.406
Appalachian State	6	–	12	.333	11	–	21	.344
Little Rock	5	–	13	.278	10	–	21	.323
Troy	5	–	13	.278	12	–	18	.400
† 2019 Sun Belt Conference tournament winner

The 2018–19 UT Arlington Mavericks men's basketball team represented the University of Texas at Arlington during the 2018–19 NCAA Division I men's basketball season. The Mavericks, led by first-year head coach Chris Ogden, played their home games at the College Park Center as members of the Sun Belt Conference. They finished the season 17–16, 12–6 in Sun Belt play to finish a three-way tie for second place. As the No. 2 seed in the Sun Belt tournament, they defeated Georgia Southern in the semifinals before losing to Georgia State in the championship.

== Previous season ==
The Mavericks finished the 2017–18 season 21–13, 10–8 in Sun Belt play to finish in fourth place. They defeated Appalachian State and Louisiana to advance to the championship game of the Sun Belt tournament where they lost to Georgia State. Despite having 21 wins, they did not participate in a postseason tournament.

On March 26, 2018, head coach Scott Cross was fired after 12 seasons at UT Arlington, along with his entire staff, with UTA's Athletic Director citing a change in the program's leadership. On April 6, the school hired former Texas Tech assistant Chris Ogden as head coach.

== Roster ==
2018–19 Texas–Arlington Mavericks men's basketball team
Players
Coaches

Pos.	#	Name	Height	Weight	Year	Hometown
G	0	Brian Warren	5 ft 9 in (1.75 m)	160 lb (73 kg)	Jr	Indianapolis, Indiana
G	2	DJ Bryant	5 ft 11 in (1.8 m)	185 lb (84 kg)	Jr	Sarasota, Florida
F	3	Ayoub Nouhi	6 ft 5 in (1.96 m)	196 lb (89 kg)	Fr	Brussels, Belgium
G	4	David Azore	6 ft 4 in (1.93 m)	205 lb (93 kg)	RS Fr	Houston, Texas
G	5	Edric Dennis	6 ft 0 in (1.83 m)	190 lb (86 kg)	RS Jr	Dallas, Texas
G	10	Radshad Davis	6 ft 2 in (1.88 m)	205 lb (93 kg)	Jr	Nassau, Bahamas
F	13	Jabari Narcis	6 ft 9 in (2.06 m)	230 lb (104 kg)	Jr	Chaguanas, Trinidad and Tobago
F	15	Scott Muirhead	6 ft 3 in (1.91 m)	206 lb (93 kg)	RS Jr	Ennis, Texas
F	20	Andres Ibarguen	6 ft 5 in (1.96 m)	230 lb (104 kg)	Jr	Santa Marta, Colombia
G	21	Pedro Castro	6 ft 6 in (1.98 m)	185 lb (84 kg)	RS Fr	Fort Worth, Texas
G	22	Tiandre Jackson-Young	6 ft 3 in (1.91 m)	195 lb (88 kg)	Jr	Marshall, Texas
F	23	Patrick Mwamba	6 ft 5 in (1.96 m)	188 lb (85 kg)	Fr	Bukavu, Democratic Republic of the Congo
G	30	Patrick Binzer	6 ft 1 in (1.85 m)	180 lb (82 kg)	Jr	Weatherford, Texas
G	33	McKade Marquis	6 ft 0 in (1.83 m)	215 lb (98 kg)	Fr	Whitehouse, Texas

Head coach

- Chris Ogden (Texas)

Assistant coach(es)

- Greg Young (Howard Payne)
- Riley Davis (Howard)
- Royce Johnson (Thomas Edison State)

Legend

- (C) Team captain
- (S) Suspended
- (I) Ineligible
- (W) Walk-on
- Injured
- Current redshirt

Roster
Last update: January 7, 2019

== Schedule and results ==
Date time, TV	Rank^{#}	Opponent^{#}	Result	Record	Site (attendance) city, state
Non-conference regular season
Nov 6, 2018*; 7:00 pm, ESPN+		UT Tyler	W 90–66	1–0	College Park Center (1,710); Arlington, TX
Nov 10, 2018*; 7:00 pm, ESPN+		Northern Iowa	W 74–65	2–0	College Park Center (3,789); Arlington, TX
Nov 16, 2018*; 7:00 pm, ESPN+		Texas A&M–Corpus Christi; Hardwood Showcase	L 67–73	2–1	College Park Center (1,569); Arlington, TX
Nov 18, 2018*; 12:00 pm, ESPN+		UC Davis; Hardwood Showcase	W 68–59	3–1	College Park Center (1,233); Arlington, TX
Nov 20, 2018*; 6:00 pm, BTN		at Indiana; Hardwood Showcase	L 64–78	3–2	Simon Skjodt Assembly Hall (11,957); Bloomington, IN
Nov 23, 2018*; 7:00 pm, SECN Plus		at Arkansas; Hardwood Showcase	L 60–78	3–3	Bud Walton Arena (17,403); Fayetteville, AR
Nov 27, 2018*; 7:00 pm		at Tulsa	L 58–72	3–4	Reynolds Center (3,107); Tulsa, OK
Dec 1, 2018*; 2:00 pm, ESPN+		Texas–Rio Grande Valley	L 65–76	3–5	College Park Center (1,330); Arlington, TX
Dec 4, 2018*; 7:00 pm, SECN Plus		at Missouri	L 45–65	3–6	Mizzou Arena (9,428); Columbia, MO
Dec 8, 2018*; 5:00 pm		at North Texas	L 61–63	3–7	The Super Pit (4,275); Denton, TX
Dec 18, 2018*; 8:00 pm, RTNW		at No. 8 Gonzaga	L 55–89	3–8	McCarthey Athletic Center (6,000); Spokane, WA
Dec 21, 2018*; 9:00 pm		at Cal Poly	W 75–70 ^{OT}	4–8	Mott Athletic Center (1,515); San Luis Obispo, CA
Dec 28, 2018*; 7:00 pm, LHN		at Texas	L 56–76	4–9	Frank Erwin Center (9,188); Austin, TX
Sun Belt Conference regular season
Jan 3, 2019; 7:00 pm, ESPN+		Georgia State	L 58–63	4–10 (0–1)	College Park Center (1,425); Arlington, TX
Jan 5, 2019; 2:00 pm, ESPN+		Georgia Southern	L 64–77	4–11 (0–2)	College Park Center (1,530); Arlington, TX
Jan 10, 2019; 6:00 pm		Appalachian State	W 82–72	5–11 (1–2)	Holmes Center (827); Boone, NC
Jan 12, 2019; 1:00 pm, ESPN+		Coastal Carolina	W 61–58	6–11 (2–2)	HTC Center (989); Conway, SC
Jan 17, 2019; 7:00 pm, ESPN+		Arkansas State	W 68–59	7–11 (3–2)	College Park Center (2,013); Arlington, TX
Jan 19, 2019; 2:00 pm, ESPN+		Little Rock	W 82–73	8–11 (4–2)	College Park Center (1,466); Arlington, TX
Jan 24, 2019; 6:00 pm, ESPN+		at Georgia Southern	W 72–67	9–11 (5–2)	Hanner Fieldhouse (2,357); Statesboro, GA
Jan 26, 2019; 12:00 pm, ESPN+		at Georgia State	L 71–77	9–12 (5–3)	GSU Sports Arena (1,669); Atlanta, GA
Feb 2, 2019; 4:00 pm, ESPN+		at Texas State	W 84–77 ^{2OT}	10–12 (6–3)	Strahan Coliseum (6,581); San Marcos, TX
Feb 7, 2019; 7:00 pm, ESPN+		Coastal Carolina	W 74–54	11–12 (7–3)	College Park Center; Arlington, TX
Feb 9, 2019; 2:00 pm, ESPN+		Appalachian State	W 78–68	12–12 (8–3)	College Park Center; Arlington, TX
Feb 14, 2019; 6:30 pm, ESPN+		at Little Rock	L 52–56	12–13 (8–4)	Jack Stephens Center; Little Rock, AR
Feb 16, 2019; 4:00 pm, ESPN+		at Arkansas State	L 79–83	12–14 (8–5)	First National Bank Arena; Jonesboro, AR
Feb 21, 2019; 7:00 pm, ESPN+		Louisiana	L 64–76	12–15 (8–6)	College Park Center; Arlington, TX
Feb 23, 2019; 2:00 pm, ESPN+		Louisiana–Monroe	W 91–86 ^{2OT}	13–15 (9–6)	College Park Center; Arlington, TX
Feb 28, 2019; 7:00 pm, ESPN+		at South Alabama	W 75–57	14–15 (10–6)	Mitchell Center; Mobile, AL
Mar 2, 2019; 2:00 pm, ESPN+		at Troy	W 79–66	15–15 (11–6)	Trojan Arena; Troy, AL
Mar 9, 2019; 2:00 pm, ESPN+		Texas State	W 81–73	16–15 (12–6)	College Park Center; Arlington, TX
Sun Belt tournament
Mar 16, 2019; 5:30 pm, ESPN+	(2)	vs. (3) Georgia Southern semifinals	W 67–58	17–15	Lakefront Arena (1,344); New Orleans, LA
Mar 17, 2019; 1:00 pm, ESPN2	(2)	vs. (1) Georgia State championship	L 64–73	17–16	Lakefront Arena (1,473); New Orleans, LA
*Non-conference game. ^{#}Rankings from AP Poll. (#) Tournament seedings in parentheses. All times are in Central Time.
