= 2018–19 Appalachian State Mountaineers men's basketball team =

American college basketball season

2018–19 Appalachian State Mountaineers men's basketball
- Conference: Sun Belt Conference
- Record: 11–21 (6–12 Sun Belt)
- Head coach: Jim Fox (5th season)
- Assistant coaches: Jason Allison; Wilbur Allen; I.J. Poole
- Home arena: George M. Holmes Convocation Center

2018–19 Sun Belt Conference men's basketball standings
	Conf.				Overall
Team	W		L	PCT	W		L	PCT
Georgia State †	13	–	5	.722	24	–	10	.706
UT Arlington	12	–	6	.667	17	–	16	.515
Georgia Southern	12	–	6	.667	21	–	12	.636
Texas State	12	–	6	.667	24	–	10	.706
Louisiana	10	–	8	.556	19	–	13	.594
Coastal Carolina	9	–	9	.500	17	–	17	.500
Louisiana–Monroe	9	–	9	.500	19	–	16	.543
South Alabama	8	–	10	.444	17	–	17	.500
Arkansas State	7	–	11	.389	13	–	19	.406
Appalachian State	6	–	12	.333	11	–	21	.344
Little Rock	5	–	13	.278	10	–	21	.323
Troy	5	–	13	.278	12	–	18	.400
† 2019 Sun Belt Conference tournament winner

The 2018–19 Appalachian State Mountaineers men's basketball team represented Appalachian State University during the 2018–19 NCAA Division I men's basketball season. The Mountaineers, led by fifth-year head coach Jim Fox, played their home games at the George M. Holmes Convocation Center in Boone, North Carolina as members of the Sun Belt Conference. They finished the season 11–21, 6–12 in Sun Belt play to finish in 10th place. They lost in the first round of the Sun Belt tournament to Louisiana–Monroe.

== Previous season ==
The Mountaineers finished the 2017–18 season 15–18, 9–9 in Sun Belt play to finish in a three-way tie for fifth place. They defeated Little Rock in the first round of the Sun Belt tournament before losing in the quarterfinals to UT Arlington.

== Roster ==
2018–19 Appalachian State Mountaineers men's basketball team
Players
Coaches

Pos.	#	Name	Height	Weight	Year	Hometown
F	0	Isaac Johnson	6 ft 9 in (2.06 m)	212 lb (96 kg)	Jr	Charlotte, North Carolina
G	1	Justin Forrest	6 ft 2 in (1.88 m)	195 lb (88 kg)	So	Decatur, Georgia
G	2	Ronshad Shabazz	6 ft 5 in (1.96 m)	217 lb (98 kg)	Sr	Raleigh, North Carolina
G	3	Nick Hough	6 ft 4 in (1.93 m)	205 lb (93 kg)	RS Sr	Harrisburg, North Carolina
G	4	O'Showen Williams	5 ft 11 in (1.8 m)	190 lb (86 kg)	RS Jr	Macon, Georgia
G	10	Michael Bibby	6 ft 3 in (1.91 m)	175 lb (79 kg)	RS So	Phoenix, Arizona
G	11	Joseph Battle	6 ft 3 in (1.91 m)	181 lb (82 kg)	RS So	Abbeville, South Carolina
G	13	Kevin Kerley	6 ft 0 in (1.83 m)	178 lb (81 kg)	Sr	Loveland, Ohio
F	14	Bennett Holley	6 ft 8 in (2.03 m)	238 lb (108 kg)	Sr	Roanoke, Virginia
C	15	Jake Wilson	7 ft 1 in (2.16 m)	240 lb (109 kg)	RS Sr	Raleigh, North Carolina
G	20	Adrian Delph	6 ft 3 in (1.91 m)	185 lb (84 kg)	RS Fr	Kings Mountain, North Carolina
F	21	James Lewis	6 ft 8 in (2.03 m)	215 lb (98 kg)	RS So	Mount Holly, North Carolina
F	22	Breki Gylfason	6 ft 9 in (2.06 m)	205 lb (93 kg)	RS Fr	Reykjavík, Iceland
G	23	Trey Ford	6 ft 0 in (1.83 m)	180 lb (82 kg)	Sr	Mooresville, North Carolina
F	32	Tyrell Johnson	6 ft 8 in (2.03 m)	205 lb (93 kg)	Sr	Atlanta, Georgia
F	50	Hunter Seacaat	6 ft 9 in (2.06 m)	235 lb (107 kg)	RS Jr	Mooresville, North Carolina

Head coach

- Jim Fox (SUNY Geneseo)

Assistant coach(es)

- Jason Allison (Liberty)
- Wilbur Allen (Temple)
- I.J. Poole (Texas)

Legend

- (C) Team captain
- (S) Suspended
- (I) Ineligible
- (W) Walk-on
- Injured
- Current redshirt

Roster
Last update: January 5, 2019

== Schedule and results ==
Date time, TV	Rank^{#}	Opponent^{#}	Result	Record	Site (attendance) city, state
Exhibition
Nov 1, 2018*; 7:00 pm		Ferrum	W 97–44		Holmes Center; Boone, NC
Non-conference regular season
Nov 6, 2018*; 7:00 pm		Mars Hill	W 125–62	1–0	Holmes Center (718); Boone, NC
Nov 11, 2018*; 7:00 pm, SECN		at Alabama; Charleston Classic campus game	L 73–81	1–1	Coleman Coliseum (9,701); Tuscaloosa, AL
Nov 15, 2018*; 5:00 pm, ESPN2		vs. No. 23 Purdue; Charleston Classic quarterfinals	L 70–92	1–2	TD Arena (4,017); Charleston, SC
Nov 16, 2018*; 4:30 pm, ESPNU		vs. Wichita State; Charleston Classic consolation 2nd round	L 76–82	1–3	TD Arena (4,135); Charleston, SC
Nov 18, 2018*; 11:00 am, ESPN3		vs. Ball State; Charleston Classic 7th place game	L 86–94 ^{OT}	1–4	TD Arena (2,862); Charleston, SC
Nov 26, 2018*; 7:00 pm		Winston-Salem State	W 91–64	2–4	Holmes Center (667); Boone, NC
Nov 30, 2018*; 7:00 pm, ESPN3		at East Carolina	L 81–83	2–5	Williams Arena (3,552); Greenville, NC
Dec 4, 2018*; 7:00 pm, ESPN+		Howard	W 100–86	3–5	Holmes Center (603); Boone, NC
Dec 8, 2018*; 2:00 pm, ESPN+		North Carolina Central	W 82–73	4–5	Holmes Center (827); Boone, NC
Dec 15, 2018*; 1:00 pm, ESPN3		at South Florida	L 69–76	4–6	Yuengling Center; Tampa, FL
Dec 18, 2018*; 6:30 pm, ESPN3		at Georgetown	L 73–83	4–7	Capital One Arena (4,205); Washington, D.C.
Dec 20, 2018*; 7:00 pm, ESPN+		Milligan	W 99–60	5–7	Holmes Center (425); Boone, NC
Dec 30, 2018*; 3:00 pm, ESPN3		at Saint Louis	L 55–83	5–8	Chaifetz Arena (7,143); St. Louis, MO
Sun Belt Conference regular season
Jan 3, 2019; 8:00 pm, ESPN+		at South Alabama	L 73–79	5–9 (0–1)	Mitchell Center (1,729); Mobile, AL
Jan 5, 2019; 3:00 pm, ESPN+		at Troy	L 85–89	5–10 (0–2)	Trojan Arena (1,902); Troy, AL
Jan 10, 2019; 7:00 pm		UT Arlington	L 72–82	5–11 (0–3)	Holmes Center (827); Boone, NC
Jan 12, 2019; 2:00 pm		Texas State	L 69–70	5–12 (0–4)	Holmes Center (953); Boone, NC
Jan 19, 2019; 2:00 pm, ESPN+		at Coastal Carolina	L 72–89	5–13 (0–5)	HTC Center (2,031); Conway, SC
Jan 24, 2019; 8:00 pm, ESPN+		at Arkansas State	L 81–82	5–14 (0–6)	First National Bank Arena (2,112); Jonesboro, AR
Jan 26, 2019; 4:00 pm, ESPN+		at Little Rock	W 77–73	6–14 (1–6)	Jack Stephens Center (1,708); Little Rock, AR
Jan 31, 2019; 7:00 pm, ESPN+		Louisiana	W 104–77	7–14 (2–6)	Holmes Center (853); Boone, NC
Feb 2, 2019; 2:00 pm, ESPN+		Louisiana–Monroe	W 85–84	8–14 (3–6)	Holmes Center (1,403); Boone, NC
Feb 7, 2019; 8:00 pm, ESPN+		at Texas State	L 71–74	8–15 (3–7)	Strahan Coliseum (4,517); San Marcos, TX
Feb 9, 2019; 3:00 pm		at UT Arlington	L 68–78	8–16 (3–8)	College Park Center (2,066); Arlington, TX
Feb 16, 2019; 2:00 pm, ESPN+		Coastal Carolina	W 88–79	9–16 (4–8)	Holmes Center (2,037); Boone, NC
Feb 21, 2019; 7:00 pm, ESPN+		Georgia State	L 75–80	9–17 (4–9)	Holmes Center (1,653); Boone, NC
Feb 23, 2019; 2:00 pm, ESPN+		Georgia Southern	L 69–92	9–18 (4–10)	Holmes Center (1,722); Boone, NC
Feb 28, 2019; 8:00 pm		at Louisiana–Monroe	L 75–81	9–19 (4–11)	Fant–Ewing Coliseum (3,104); Monroe, LA
Mar 3, 2019; ESPN+		at Louisiana	W 90–80	10–19 (5–11)	Cajundome (3,437); Lafayette, LA
Mar 7, 2019; 2:00 pm, ESPN+		Troy	W 72–67	11–19 (6–11)	Holmes Center (572); Boone, NC
Mar 9, 2019; 2:00 pm, ESPN+		South Alabama	L 71–78	11–20 (6–12)	Holmes Center (1,104); Boone, NC
Sun Belt tournament
Mar 12, 2019; 8:00 pm, ESPN+	(10)	vs. (7) Louisiana–Monroe	L 80–89	11–21	Fant–Ewing Coliseum (4,522); Monroe, LA
*Non-conference game. ^{#}Rankings from AP Poll. (#) Tournament seedings in parentheses. All times are in Eastern Time.
