= Eito Yuminami =

Japanese basketball player

Eito Yuminami 弓波英人
No. 8 – Nagasaki Velca
- Position: Point guard
- League: B.League

Personal information
- Born: July 2, 1999 (age 27) Chiba, Japan
- Listed height: 169 cm (5 ft 7 in)
- Listed weight: 69 kg (152 lb)

Career information
- High school: Pine Lake Preparatory (Mooresville, North Carolina)
- College: Georgia Southern (2018–2021)
- Playing career: 2021–present

Career history
- 2021–present: Nagasaki Velca

Eito Yuminami (弓波英人, ゆみなみえいと, born July 2, 1999) is a Japanese professional basketball player for Nagasaki Velca of the B.League. He played college basketball for the Georgia Southern Eagles.

== Early life ==
Yuminami was born in Chiba, Japan to Wakako and Shinichi Yuminami. He started playing basketball at the age of three as an influence of his father who was then coaching an elementary school basketball team. When Yuminami was nine years old, his family moved to the United States and settled in Huntersville, North Carolina. At the time, he could not speak any English. He attended J.V. Washam Elementary in Cornelius, North Carolina and cited basketball as the instrument that helped him in making social connections and overcoming the language barrier he experienced.

== High school career ==
Yuminami attended Pine Lake Preparatory in Mooresville, North Carolina and played varsity basketball for the Pride.

As a sophomore, Yuminami averaged 13.0 points, 2.0 rebounds, 4.0 assists and 1.9 steals per game, helping the Pride finish third in the Southern Piedmont 1A Conference with a 10–5 record. In his efforts, Yuminami earned the All-Southern Piedmont Conference selection.

In his junior year, Yuminami averaged 9.7 points, 2.2 rebounds, 4.7 assists and 2.2 steals per game. Pine Lake finished fifth in the Southern Piedmont 1A Conference with an 8–8 record.

As a senior, Yuminami averaged 8.1 points, 2.0 rebounds, 5.9 assists and 1.6 steals per game, helping the Pride finish first in the PAC-7 1A Conference with a 12–0 record. For his performance, he earned the All-PAC-7 Conference selection. Yuminami also received the PGC Leadership Award from the North Carolina Coaches Association.

Yuminami finished off his high school career as the school's all-time assist leader.

== College career ==
Yuminami attended Georgia Southern University and played for the Eagles.

On November 7, 2018, he made his collegiate debut in a pre-season game against Carver College, posting four points, one rebound and one assist in four minutes of action. As a freshman, Yuminami played in eight games, averaging 1.0 points, 0.5 rebounds and 0.1 assists per game.

On December 6, 2019, Yuminami registered a season-high 11 points, shooting 3-for-3 from the field and 3-for-3 from three, in addition to one rebound, two assists and two steals across 10 minutes of play in a 100–70 win over Carver College. During his sophomore season, he averaged 1.7 points, 0.2 rebounds and 0.3 assists over nine games.

On December 20, 2020, Yuminami posted a season-high eight points on 3-for-3 shooting from the field across 11 minutes of action in a win against Carver College. As a junior, he averaged 2.2 points and 0.6 rebounds in five games played.

== Professional career ==
=== Nagasaki Velca (2021–present) ===
On March 30, 2021, Yuminami signed with the Nagasaki Velca of the B.League.

== Personal life ==
Yuminami was a business management major at Georgia Southern University. For being able to maintain a grade point average (GPA) of at least 3.5, he was named into the Sun Belt Commissioner's List in 2019 and 2020. He was also named to the Georgia Southern President's List twice (spring 2019–20 and fall 2020–21) and the Dean's List thrice (spring 2018–19, fall 2019–20 and spring 2020–21).

== Career statistics ==
Legend
GP	Games played	GS	Games started	MPG	Minutes per game
FG%	Field goal percentage	3P%	3-point field goal percentage	FT%	Free throw percentage
RPG	Rebounds per game	APG	Assists per game	SPG	Steals per game
BPG	Blocks per game	PPG	Points per game	**Bold**	Career high

=== College ===
Year	Team	GP	GS	MPG	FG%	3P%	FT%	RPG	APG	SPG	BPG	PPG
2018–19	Georgia Southern	8	0	2.3	.600	–	**1.000**	.5	.1	–	–	1.0
2019–20	Georgia Southern	**9**	0	2.4	.429	.600	**1.000**	.2	**.3**	.2	–	1.7
2020–21	Georgia Southern	5	0	**5.2**	**.750**	–	.714	**.6**	–	–	–	**2.2**
Career		22	0	3.0	.563	.600	.867	.4	.2	.2	–	1.5
