= 2018–19 Little Rock Trojans men's basketball team =

American college basketball season

2018–19 Little Rock Trojans men's basketball
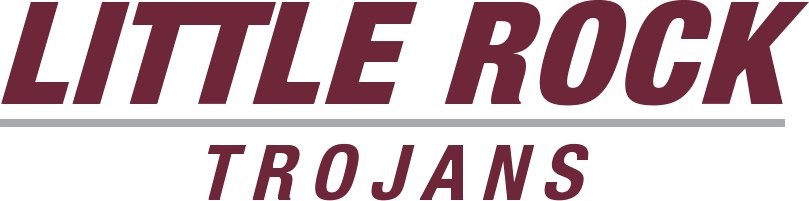
- Conference: Sun Belt Conference
- Record: 10–21 (5–13 Sun Belt)
- Head coach: Darrell Walker (1st season)
- Assistant coaches: Charles Baker; Alfred Jordan; Matt Wise
- Home arena: Jack Stephens Center

2018–19 Sun Belt Conference men's basketball standings
	Conf.				Overall
Team	W		L	PCT	W		L	PCT
Georgia State †	13	–	5	.722	24	–	10	.706
UT Arlington	12	–	6	.667	17	–	16	.515
Georgia Southern	12	–	6	.667	21	–	12	.636
Texas State	12	–	6	.667	24	–	10	.706
Louisiana	10	–	8	.556	19	–	13	.594
Coastal Carolina	9	–	9	.500	17	–	17	.500
Louisiana–Monroe	9	–	9	.500	19	–	16	.543
South Alabama	8	–	10	.444	17	–	17	.500
Arkansas State	7	–	11	.389	13	–	19	.406
Appalachian State	6	–	12	.333	11	–	21	.344
Little Rock	5	–	13	.278	10	–	21	.323
Troy	5	–	13	.278	12	–	18	.400
† 2019 Sun Belt Conference tournament winner

The 2018–19 Little Rock Trojans men's basketball team represented the University of Arkansas at Little Rock during the 2018–19 NCAA Division I men's basketball season. The Trojans, led by first-year head coach Darrell Walker, played their home games at the Jack Stephens Center in Little Rock, Arkansas as members of the Sun Belt Conference. They finished the season 10–21, 5–13 in Sun Belt play to finish in a tie for last place. They failed to qualify for the Sun Belt tournament.

== Previous season ==
The Trojans finished the 2017–18 season 7–25, 4–14 in Sun Belt play to finish in last place. They lost in the first round of the Sun Belt tournament to Appalachian State.

On March 9, 2018, the school fired head coach Wes Flanigan after just two seasons where he compiled a record of 22–42. On March 29, the school hired former NBA player Darrell Walker who had spent the last two seasons as head coach of Division II Clark Atlanta University.

== Roster ==
2018–19 Little Rock Trojans men's basketball team
Players
Coaches

Pos.	#	Name	Height	Weight	Year	Hometown
G	0	Ryan Pippins	6 ft 0 in (1.83 m)	250 lb (113 kg)	Jr	Little Rock, Arkansas
G	1	Markquis Nowell	5 ft 8 in (1.73 m)	165 lb (75 kg)	Fr	Harlem, New York
G	2	Deondre Burns	6 ft 2 in (1.88 m)	185 lb (84 kg)	RS Jr	Yazoo City, Mississippi
G	3	Rayjon Tucker	6 ft 5 in (1.96 m)	210 lb (95 kg)	RS Jr	Charlotte, North Carolina
G	11	Jaizec Lottie	6 ft 1 in (1.85 m)	170 lb (77 kg)	So	Aurora, Colorado
G	12	Terrell Curtis II	5 ft 11 in (1.8 m)	165 lb (75 kg)	Fr	Maumelle, Arkansas
F	14	Damir Hadzic	6 ft 8 in (2.03 m)	227 lb (103 kg)	So	Sarajevo, Bosnia and Herzegovina
F	20	Kamani Johnson	6 ft 8 in (2.03 m)	195 lb (88 kg)	Fr	Brooklyn, New York
F	23	Dani Koljanin	6 ft 8 in (2.03 m)	220 lb (100 kg)	Sr	Pula, Croatia
F	25	Horace Wyatt, Jr.	6 ft 7 in (2.01 m)	170 lb (77 kg)	RS Fr	Atlanta, Georgia
F	32	Kris Bankston	6 ft 8 in (2.03 m)	194 lb (88 kg)	So	Dewitt, Arkansas
F	55	Nikola Marić	6 ft 10 in (2.08 m)	245 lb (111 kg)	Fr	Trebinje, Bosnia and Herzegovina

Head coach

- Darrell Walker (Arkansas)

Assistant coach(es)

- Charles Baker (Eastern Kentucky)
- Alfred Jordan (Clark Atlanta)
- Matt Wise (Transylvania)

Legend

- (C) Team captain
- (S) Suspended
- (I) Ineligible
- (W) Walk-on
- Injured
- Current redshirt

Roster
Last update: January 7, 2019

== Schedule and results ==
Date time, TV	Rank^{#}	Opponent^{#}	Result	Record	Site (attendance) city, state
Non-conference regular season
Nov 8, 2018*; 6:00 pm		SE Oklahoma State	W 101–92 ^{OT}	1–0	Jack Stephens Center (1,854); Little Rock, AR
Nov 13, 2018*; 7:00 pm, ESPN+		at Tennessee State	W 83–67	2–0	Gentry Complex (679); Nashville, TN
Nov 16, 2018*; 10:00 pm, ESPNU		at Nevada; Las Vegas Holiday Invitational	L 59–87	2–1	Lawlor Events Center (10,273); Reno, NV
Nov 19, 2018*; 7:00 pm		at Tulsa; Las Vegas Holiday Invitational	L 78–88	2–2	Reynolds Center (3,118); Tulsa, OK
Nov 23, 2018*; 3:30 pm		Howard; Las Vegas Holiday Invitational regional semifinals	W 97–76	3–2	Jack Stephens Center (1,448); Little Rock, AR
Nov 24, 2018*; 3:30 pm		Arkansas–Pine Bluff; Las Vegas Holiday Invitational regional finals	L 66–75	3–3	Jack Stephens Center (1,448); Little Rock, AR
Nov 28, 2018*; 7:00 pm		at Central Arkansas	L 65–78	3–4	Farris Center (2,755); Conway, AR
Dec 1, 2018*; 3:00 pm		Sam Houston State	W 79–52	4–4	Jack Stephens Center (2,755); Little Rock, AR
Dec 4, 2018*; 6:30 pm		Bradley	L 62–68	4–5	Jack Stephens Center (1,388); Little Rock, AR
Dec 8, 2018*; 5:30 pm		Central Arkansas	L 82–85	4–6	Jack Stephens Center (1,805); Little Rock, AR
Dec 11, 2018*; 6:30 pm		Miles	W 67–47	5–6	Jack Stephens Center (1,008); Little Rock, AR
Dec 19, 2018*; 7:00 pm, ESPN3		at Memphis	L 89–99	5–7	FedExForum (13,599); Memphis, TN
Dec 22, 2018*; 11:00 am, FSN		at Georgetown	L 94–102 ^{OT}	5–8	Capital One Arena (5,189); Washington, D.C.
Sun Belt Conference regular season
Jan 3, 2019; 7:00 pm, ESPN+		at Louisiana–Monroe	L 84–97	5–9 (0–1)	Fant–Ewing Coliseum (1,618); Monroe, LA
Jan 5, 2019; 7:00 pm, ESPN+		at Louisiana	L 61–75	5–10 (0–2)	Cajundome (1,618); Lafayette, LA
Jan 10, 2019; 6:30 pm, ESPN+		Troy	L 59–73	6–10 (1–2)	Jack Stephens Center (1,318); Little Rock, AR
Jan 12, 2019; 3:00 pm, ESPN+		South Alabama	W 91–62	7–10 (2–2)	Jack Stephens Center (1,565); Little Rock, AR
Jan 17, 2019; 7:00 pm, ESPN+		at Texas State	L 62–80	7–11 (2–3)	Strahan Coliseum (2,107); San Marcos, TX
Jan 19, 2019; 2:00 pm, ESPN+		at UT Arlington	L 73–82	7–12 (2–4)	College Park Center (1,466); Arlington, TX
Jan 24, 2019; 6:30 pm, ESPN+		Coastal Carolina	L 71–72	7–13 (2–5)	Jack Stephens Center (1,459); Little Rock, AR
Jan 26, 2019; 3:00 pm, ESPN+		Appalachian State	L 73–77	7–14 (2–6)	Jack Stephens Center (1,708); Little Rock, AR
Feb 2, 2019; 5:30 pm, ESPN+		Arkansas State	L 83–84	7–15 (2–7)	Jack Stephens Center (3,909); Little Rock, AR
Feb 7, 2019; 6:00 pm, ESPN+		at Troy	W 84–70	8–15 (3–7)	Trojan Arena (3,228); Troy, AL
Feb 9, 2019; 3:00 pm, ESPN+		at South Alabama	W 73–68	9–15 (4–7)	College Park Center (2,193); Arlington, TX
Feb 14, 2019; 6:30 pm, ESPN+		UT Arlington	W 56–52	10–15 (5–7)	Jack Stephens Center (1,188); Little Rock, AR
Feb 16, 2019; 5:30 pm, ESPN+		Texas State	L 60–67	10–16 (5–8)	Jack Stephens Center (1,677); Little Rock, AR
Feb 23, 2019; 4:00 pm, ESPN+		at Arkansas State	L 65–72	10–17 (5–9)	First National Bank Arena (2,278); Jonesboro, AR
Feb 28, 2019; 6:00 pm, ESPN+		at Georgia Southern	L 66–81	10–18 (5–10)	Hanner Fieldhouse (1,265); Statesboro, GA
Mar 2, 2019; 12:00 pm, ESPN+		at Georgia State	L 70–83	10–19 (5–11)	GSU Sports Arena (2,004); Atlanta, GA
Mar 7, 2019; 6:30 pm, ESPN+		Louisiana	L 72–77	10–20 (5–12)	Jack Stephens Center (1,574); Little Rock, AR
Mar 9, 2019; 3:00 pm, ESPN+		Louisiana–Monroe	L 62–79	10–21 (5–13)	Jack Stephens Center (1,407); Little Rock, AR
*Non-conference game. ^{#}Rankings from AP Poll. (#) Tournament seedings in parentheses. All times are in Central Time.
