= 2019 Sun Belt Conference men's basketball tournament =

Men's basketball tournament

- Classification: Division I
- Season: 2018–19
- Teams: 10
- Site: Lakefront Arena; New Orleans, Louisiana
- Champions: Georgia State (3rd title)
- Winning coach: Ron Hunter (3rd title)
- MVP: Malik Benlevi (Georgia State)
- Television: ESPN+, ESPN2

2018–19 Sun Belt Conference men's basketball standings
| | Conf. | | | | Overall |
| Team | W | | L | PCT | W | | L | PCT |
|---|---|---|---|---|---|---|---|---|
| Georgia State † | 13 | – | 5 | .722 | 24 | – | 10 | .706 |
| UT Arlington | 12 | – | 6 | .667 | 17 | – | 16 | .515 |
| Georgia Southern | 12 | – | 6 | .667 | 21 | – | 12 | .636 |
| Texas State | 12 | – | 6 | .667 | 24 | – | 10 | .706 |
| Louisiana | 10 | – | 8 | .556 | 19 | – | 13 | .594 |
| Coastal Carolina | 9 | – | 9 | .500 | 17 | – | 17 | .500 |
| Louisiana–Monroe | 9 | – | 9 | .500 | 19 | – | 16 | .543 |
| South Alabama | 8 | – | 10 | .444 | 17 | – | 17 | .500 |
| Arkansas State | 7 | – | 11 | .389 | 13 | – | 19 | .406 |
| Appalachian State | 6 | – | 12 | .333 | 11 | – | 21 | .344 |
| Little Rock | 5 | – | 13 | .278 | 10 | – | 21 | .323 |
| Troy | 5 | – | 13 | .278 | 12 | – | 18 | .400 |
† 2019 Sun Belt Conference tournament winner

The 2019 Sun Belt Conference men's basketball tournament was the postseason men's basketball tournament for Sun Belt Conference during the 2018–19 NCAA Division I men's basketball season. Tournament first-round games were played at the campus of the higher seeded team on March 12. The remainder of the tournament was held from March 14–17, 2019, in New Orleans, Louisiana, at Lakefront Arena. Georgia State defeated UT Arlington 73–64 in the championship game to win the tournament, and received the conference's automatic bid to the 2019 NCAA tournament. It was the third tournament championship for Georgia State, and their second consecutive.

== Seeds ==
Only the top 10 of the 12 conference teams were eligible for the tournament. The 3rd and 4th place teams received a double bye to the quarterfinals of the tournament, while the top 2 teams received a triple bye to the semifinals. Teams were seeded by record within the conference, with a tiebreaker system to seed teams with identical conference records.

| Seed | School | Conference | Tiebreaker |
|---|---|---|---|
| 1 | Georgia State | 13–5 | |
| 2 | UT Arlington | 12–6 | 3–1 vs. GA Southern/Texas State, 2–0 vs. Texas State |
| 3 | Georgia Southern | 12–6 | 2–2 vs. UTA/Texas State, 1–1 vs. Texas State |
| 4 | Texas State | 12–6 | 1–3 vs. GA Southern/UTA |
| 5 | Louisiana | 10–8 | |
| 6 | Coastal Carolina | 9–9 | 2–0 vs. Louisiana–Monroe |
| 7 | Louisiana–Monroe | 9–9 | 0–2 vs. Coastal Carolina |
| 8 | South Alabama | 8–10 | |
| 9 | Arkansas State | 7–11 | |
| 10 | Appalachian State | 6–12 | |

== Schedule ==
| Game | Time | Matchup | Score | Television |
First round – Tuesday, March 12, 2019 – campus sites
| 1 | 7:00 pm | No. 9 Arkansas State at No. 8 South Alabama | 67–75 | ESPN+ |
| 2 | 7:00 pm | No. 10 Appalachian State at No. 7 Louisiana–Monroe | 80–89 | ESPN+ |
Second round – Thursday, March 14, 2019 – Lakefront Arena, New Orleans, LA
| 3 | 5:00 pm | No. 5 Louisiana vs No. 8 South Alabama | 69–70 | ESPN+ |
| 4 | 7:30 pm | No. 6 Coastal Carolina vs No. 7 Louisiana–Monroe | 50–80 | ESPN+ |
Quarterfinals – Friday, March 15, 2019 – Lakefront Arena, New Orleans, LA
| 5 | 5:00 pm | No. 4 Texas State vs. No. 8 South Alabama | 79–67 | ESPN+ |
| 6 | 7:30 pm | No. 3 Georgia Southern vs. No. 7 Louisiana–Monroe | 81–67 | ESPN+ |
Semifinals – Saturday, March 16, 2019 – Lakefront Arena, New Orleans, LA
| 7 | 3:00 pm | No. 1 Georgia State vs. No. 4 Texas State | 59–46 | ESPN+ |
| 8 | 5:30 pm | No. 2 UT Arlington vs. No. 3 Georgia Southern | 67–58 | ESPN+ |
Championship – Sunday, March 17, 2019 – Lakefront Arena, New Orleans, LA
| 9 | 1:00 pm | No. 1 Georgia State vs. No. 2 UT Arlington | 73–64 | ESPN2 |
Game times are in Central Time. Rankings denote tournament seed.

== Bracket ==
First round Tuesday, March 12
8 | South Alabama | 75
9 | Arkansas State | 67
7 | Louisiana–Monroe | 89
10 | Appalachian State | 80

Second round Thursday, March 14
5 | Louisiana | 69
8 | South Alabama | 70
6 | Coastal Carolina | 50
7 | Louisiana–Monroe | 80

Quarterfinals; Friday, March 15
4 | Texas State | 79
8 | South Alabama | 67
3 | Georgia Southern | 81
7 | Louisiana–Monroe | 67

Semifinals; Saturday, March 16
1 | Georgia State | 59
4 | Texas State | 46
2 | UT Arlington | 67
3 | Georgia Southern | 58

Championship; Sunday, March 17
1 | Georgia State | 73
2 | UT Arlington | 64

== See also ==
2019 Sun Belt Conference women's basketball tournament
