= 2018–19 Louisiana Ragin' Cajuns men's basketball team =

American college basketball season

2018–19 Louisiana Ragin' Cajuns men's basketball
- Conference: Sun Belt Conference
- Record: 19–13 (10–8 Sun Belt)
- Head coach: Bob Marlin (9th season)
- Assistant coaches: Neil Hardin; Kevin Johnson; Josten Crow
- Home arena: Cajundome

2018–19 Sun Belt Conference men's basketball standings
	Conf.				Overall
Team	W		L	PCT	W		L	PCT
Georgia State †	13	–	5	.722	24	–	10	.706
UT Arlington	12	–	6	.667	17	–	16	.515
Georgia Southern	12	–	6	.667	21	–	12	.636
Texas State	12	–	6	.667	24	–	10	.706
Louisiana	10	–	8	.556	19	–	13	.594
Coastal Carolina	9	–	9	.500	17	–	17	.500
Louisiana–Monroe	9	–	9	.500	19	–	16	.543
South Alabama	8	–	10	.444	17	–	17	.500
Arkansas State	7	–	11	.389	13	–	19	.406
Appalachian State	6	–	12	.333	11	–	21	.344
Little Rock	5	–	13	.278	10	–	21	.323
Troy	5	–	13	.278	12	–	18	.400
† 2019 Sun Belt Conference tournament winner

The 2018–19 Louisiana Ragin' Cajuns men's basketball team represented the University of Louisiana at Lafayette during the 2018–19 NCAA Division I men's basketball season. The Ragin' Cajuns were led by ninth-year head coach Bob Marlin and played their home games at the Cajundome as members of the Sun Belt Conference. They finished the season 19–13 overall, 10–8 in Sun Belt play to finish in fifth place. As the No. 5 seed in the Sun Belt tournament, they lost in the second round to South Alabama.

== Previous season ==
The Ragin' Cajuns finished the 2017–18 season 27–7, 16–2 in Sun Belt play to win the Sun Belt regular season championship. The conference championship was the school's first since first regular-season title since sharing the 2000 title and its first outright title since joining the conference in 1991. They defeated Texas State in the quarterfinals of the Sun Belt tournament before losing in the semifinals to UT Arlington. As a regular season conference champion who failed to win their conference tournament, they received an automatic bid to the National Invitation Tournament where they lost in the first round to LSU.

== Roster ==
2018–19 Louisiana Ragin' Cajuns men's basketball team
Players
Coaches

Pos.	#	Name	Height	Weight	Year	Hometown
F	0	Cedric Russell	6 ft 2 in (1.88 m)	190 lb (86 kg)	So	Alexandria, Louisiana
G	1	Malik Marquetti	6 ft 6 in (1.98 m)	200 lb (91 kg)	RS Sr	Compton, California
G	3	Jeremy Hayes	6 ft 3 in (1.91 m)	175 lb (79 kg)	Jr	Roseland, Louisiana
G	4	Kobe Julien	6 ft 6 in (1.98 m)	215 lb (98 kg)	Fr	Baton Rouge, Louisiana
G	5	Trajan Wesley	5 ft 9 in (1.75 m)	165 lb (75 kg)	Fr	Navasota, Texas
F	11	Jerekius Davis	6 ft 6 in (1.98 m)	225 lb (102 kg)	Jr	Jackson, Mississippi
G	13	Eli Mouton	5 ft 9 in (1.75 m)	150 lb (68 kg)	Fr	Lafayette, Louisiana
G	15	P.J. Hardy	6 ft 1 in (1.85 m)	170 lb (77 kg)	Jr	Lake Charles, Louisiana
F	21	Jalen Johnson	6 ft 7 in (2.01 m)	205 lb (93 kg)	Jr	Baton Rouge, Louisiana
F	23	JaKeenan Gant	6 ft 8 in (2.03 m)	215 lb (98 kg)	RS Sr	Springfield, Georgia
G	30	Jonathan Stove	6 ft 4 in (1.93 m)	224 lb (102 kg)	Sr	Baton Rouge, Louisiana
G	31	Mason Aucoin	6 ft 4 in (1.93 m)	195 lb (88 kg)	Jr	Luling, Louisiana
F	32	R.J. Gladney	6 ft 6 in (1.98 m)	180 lb (82 kg)	Fr	Deridder, Louisiana
F	33	Kristian Lafayette	6 ft 10 in (2.08 m)	200 lb (91 kg)	Fr	Detroit, Michigan
G	35	Marcus Stroman	6 ft 2 in (1.88 m)	200 lb (91 kg)	RS Sr	Columbia, South Carolina
F	55	Justin Miller	6 ft 6 in (1.98 m)	250 lb (113 kg)	Jr	Beaver Dam, Kentucky

Head coach

- Bob Marlin (Mississippi State)

Assistant coach(es)

- Neil Hardin (West Florida)
- Kevin Johnson (Texas–Pan American)
- Josten Crow (Sam Houston State)

Legend

- (C) Team captain
- (S) Suspended
- (I) Ineligible
- (W) Walk-on
- Injured
- Current redshirt

Roster
Last update: January 3, 2019

== Schedule and results ==
Date time, TV	Rank^{#}	Opponent^{#}	Result	Record	High points	High rebounds	High assists	Site (attendance) city, state
Non-conference regular season
Nov 6, 2018*; 7:00 pm, ESPN+		Virgin Island	W 121–80	1–0	19 – Marquetti	8 – Stroman	10 – Stroman	Cajundome (3,655); Lafayette, LA
Nov 9, 2018*; 7:00 pm, SECN Plus		at No. 6 Tennessee; NIT Season Tip-Off	L 65–87	1–1	18 – Gant	9 – Marquetti	9 – Stroman	Thompson–Boling Arena (16,864); Knoxville, TN
Nov 16, 2018*; 7:00 pm, ESPN+		at No. 2 Kansas	L 76–89	1–2	22 – Miller	7 – Miller	9 – Stroman	Allen Fieldhouse (16,300); Lawrence, KS
Nov 19, 2018*; 5:00 pm		vs. Colorado State; Gulf Coast Showcase quarterfinals	W 91–73	2–2	19 – Gant	9 – Miller	4 – Stroman	Hertz Arena (598); Estero, FL
Nov 20, 2018*; 7:30 pm		vs. Toledo; Gulf Coast Showcase semifinals	L 64–77	2–3	16 – Gant	9 – Gant	3 – Hayes	Hertz Arena (567); Estero, FL
Nov 21, 2018*; 5:00 pm		vs. Tulane; Gulf Coast Showcase 3rd place game	W 68–61	3–3	26 – Stroman	14 – Miller	3 – Stroman	Hertz Arena (764); Estero, FL
Nov 28, 2018*; 7:00 pm		at New Orleans	W 77–73 ^{OT}	4–3	12 – Marquetti	10 – Tied	7 – Stroman	Lakefront Arena (1,582); New Orleans, LA
Dec 1, 2018*; 7:00 pm, ESPN+		Southern	W 88–78	5–3	20 – Marquetti	8 – Gant	8 – Stroman	Cajundome (5,666); Lafayette, LA
Dec 5, 2018*; 7:00 pm, ESPN+		Loyola New Orleans	W 97–84	6–3	21 – Gant	13 – Gant	11 – Stroman	Cajundome (3,307); Lafayette, LA
Dec 11, 2018*; 7:00 pm, ESPN+		Prairie View A&M	W 122–90	7–3	27 – Davis	6 – Russell	11 – Stroman	Cajundome (3,227); Lafayette, LA
Dec 15, 2018*; 7:00 pm, ESPN+		Louisiana Tech	L 62–83	7–4	22 – Marquetti	10 – Miller	5 – Stroman	Cajundome (3,732); Lafayette, LA
Dec 18, 2018*; 6:30 pm, CST		at McNeese State	W 80–67	8–4	29 – Marquetti	7 – Stroman	8 – Stroman	H&HP Complex (2,590); Lake Charles, LA
Dec 29, 2018*; 4:00 pm		at Southeastern Louisiana	W 73–72	9–4	19 – Marquetti	13 – Miller	2 – Miller	University Center (772); Hammond, LA
Sun Belt regular season
Jan 3, 2019; 7:00 pm, ESPN+		Arkansas State	L 83–94	9–5 (0–1)	25 – Stroman	6 – Gant	6 – Stroman	Cajundome (3,532); Lafayette, LA
Jan 5, 2019; 7:00 pm, ESPN+		Little Rock	W 75–61	10–5 (1–1)	45 – Gant	11 – Gant	4 – Russell	Cajundome (3,571); Lafayette, LA
Jan 10, 2019; 7:00 pm, ESPN+		at Georgia State	L 76–89	10–6 (1–2)	36 – Gant	13 – Miller	9 – Stroman	GSU Sports Arena (1,211); Atlanta, GA
Jan 12, 2019; 5:00 pm, ESPN+		at Georgia Southern	W 87–85	11–6 (2–2)	22 – Gant	12 – Gant	5 – Gant	Hanner Fieldhouse (2,326); Statesboro, GA
Jan 19, 2019; 2:00 pm, ESPN+		at Louisiana–Monroe	L 95–99	11–7 (2–3)	31 – Gant	10 – Gant	12 – Stroman	Fant–Ewing Coliseum (4,317); Monroe, LA
Jan 24, 2019; 7:00 pm, ESPN+		South Alabama	W 88–84	12–7 (3–3)	28 – Gant	8 – Gant	8 – Stroman	Cajundome (3,847); Lafayette, LA
Jan 26, 2019; 7:00 pm, ESPN+		Troy	W 86–81	13–7 (4–3)	21 – Gant	10 – Gant	7 – Stroman	Cajundome (4,068); Lafayette, LA
Jan 31, 2019; 7:00 pm, ESPN+		at Appalachian State	L 77–104	13–8 (4–4)	15 – Gant	10 – Gant	2 – Hayes	Holmes Center (853); Boone, North Carolina
Feb 2, 2019; 2:00 pm, ESPN+		at Coastal Carolina	L 79–96	13–9 (4–5)	27 – Gant	12 – Gant	4 – Hardy	HTC Center (1,454); Conway, SC
Feb 6, 2019; 7:00 pm, ESPN+		Georgia Southern	L 86–103	13–10 (4–6)	23 – Gant	8 – Stroman	3 – Russell	Cajundome (3,562); Lafayette, LA
Feb 8, 2019; 8:00 pm, ESPN2		Georgia State	W 76–72	14–10 (5–6)	23 – Gant	13 – Miller	7 – Stroman	Cajundome (4,814); Lafayette, LA
Feb 16, 2019; 7:00 pm, ESPN+		Louisiana–Monroe	W 83–76	15–10 (6–6)	22 – Stroman	12 – Miller	9 – Stroman	Cajundome (5,041); Lafayette, LA
Feb 21, 2019; 7:00 pm, ESPN+		at UT Arlington	W 76–64	16–10 (7–6)	19 – Davis	12 – Miller	6 – Wesley	College Park Center (1,764); Arlington, TX
Feb 23, 2019; 4:00 pm, ESPN+		at Texas State	L 62–64	16–11 (7–7)	25 – Russell	17 – Gant	7 – Stroman	Strahan Coliseum (4,706); San Marcos, TX
Feb 28, 2019; 7:00 pm, ESPN+		Coastal Carolina	W 83–70	17–11 (8–7)	29 – Gant	7 – Davis	8 – Stroman	Cajundome (3,697); Lafayette, LA
Mar 3, 2019; 1:30 pm, ESPN+		Appalachian State	L 80–90	17–12 (8–8)	23 – Gant	15 – Gant	6 – Stroman	Cajundome (3,437); Lafayette, LA
Mar 7, 2019; 6:30 pm, ESPN+		at Little Rock	W 77–72	18–12 (9–8)	34 – Russell	7 – Tied	8 – Stroman	Jack Stephens Center (1,574); Little Rock, AR
Mar 9, 2019; 4:00 pm, ESPN+		at Arkansas State	W 90-87 ^{OT}	19–12 (10–8)	25 – Gant	15 – Miller	8 – Stroman	First National Bank Arena (2,407); Jonesboro, AR
Sun Belt tournament
Mar 14, 2019; 5:00 pm, ESPN+	(5)	vs. (8) South Alabama; Second Round	L 69–70	19–13	26 – Gant	12 – Gant	13 – Stroman	Lakefront Arena; New Orleans, LA
*Non-conference game. ^{#}Rankings from AP Poll. (#) Tournament seedings in parentheses. All times are in Central Time.
