= 2018–19 Louisiana–Monroe Warhawks men's basketball team =

American college basketball season

2018–19 Louisiana–Monroe Warhawks men's basketball

Lou Henson Classic champions

CIT, Quarterfinals
- Conference: Sun Belt Conference
- Record: 19–16 (9–9 Sun Belt)
- Head coach: Keith Richard (9th season)
- Assistant coaches: Ryan Cross; Ronnie Dean; Sam Waniewski
- Home arena: Fant–Ewing Coliseum

2018–19 Sun Belt Conference men's basketball standings
	Conf.				Overall
Team	W		L	PCT	W		L	PCT
Georgia State †	13	–	5	.722	24	–	10	.706
UT Arlington	12	–	6	.667	17	–	16	.515
Georgia Southern	12	–	6	.667	21	–	12	.636
Texas State	12	–	6	.667	24	–	10	.706
Louisiana	10	–	8	.556	19	–	13	.594
Coastal Carolina	9	–	9	.500	17	–	17	.500
Louisiana–Monroe	9	–	9	.500	19	–	16	.543
South Alabama	8	–	10	.444	17	–	17	.500
Arkansas State	7	–	11	.389	13	–	19	.406
Appalachian State	6	–	12	.333	11	–	21	.344
Little Rock	5	–	13	.278	10	–	21	.323
Troy	5	–	13	.278	12	–	18	.400
† 2019 Sun Belt Conference tournament winner

The 2018–19 Louisiana–Monroe Warhawks men's basketball team represented the University of Louisiana at Monroe in the 2018–19 NCAA Division I men's basketball season. The Warhawks, led by ninth-year head coach Keith Richard, played their home games at Fant–Ewing Coliseum as members of the Sun Belt Conference.

== Previous season ==
The Warhawks finished the 2017–18 season 16–16, 9–9 in Sun Belt play, to finish in a tie for fifth place. They defeated Arkansas State in the first round of the Sun Belt tournament before losing in the quarterfinals to Georgia Southern. They received an invitation to the CollegeInsider.com Tournament where they lost in the first round to Austin Peay.

== Roster ==
2018–19 Louisiana–Monroe Warhawks men's basketball team
Players
Coaches

Pos.	#	Name	Height	Weight	Year	Hometown
G	0	Brandon Newman	6 ft 4 in (1.93 m)	180 lb (82 kg)	Sr	Hawthorne, CA
F	1	Travis Munnings	6 ft 6 in (1.98 m)	200 lb (91 kg)	Sr	Freeport, Bahamas
G	2	Michael Ertel	6 ft 2 in (1.88 m)	175 lb (79 kg)	So	Indianapolis, IN
G	3	JD Williams	6 ft 4 in (1.93 m)	175 lb (79 kg)	Jr	Birmingham, AL
G	5	Daishon Smith	6 ft 1 in (1.85 m)	175 lb (79 kg)	Sr	Jacksonville, FL
F	10	Tyree White	6 ft 7 in (2.01 m)	190 lb (86 kg)	Jr	St. Louis, MO
F	11	Andre Washington	6 ft 8 in (2.03 m)	195 lb (88 kg)	Jr	Fort Worth, TX
G	13	Jalen Hodge	6 ft 1 in (1.85 m)	175 lb (79 kg)	Fr	O'Fallon, IL
F	20	Ty Shelby	6 ft 4 in (1.93 m)	256 lb (116 kg)	So	Houston, TX
G	22	Derrick Brock	5 ft 10 in (1.78 m)	165 lb (75 kg)	Jr	Leesville, LA
F	23	Youry White	6 ft 8 in (2.03 m)	210 lb (95 kg)	Jr	Baton Rouge, LA
G	24	Calvin Anderson	6 ft 4 in (1.93 m)	190 lb (86 kg)	Sr	Freeport, Bahamas
G	25	Wade Martin	6 ft 6 in (1.98 m)	190 lb (86 kg)	RS Jr	Point Pleasant, WV
G	53	Jontray Harris	6 ft 4 in (1.93 m)	185 lb (84 kg)	Sr	Austin, TX

Head coach

- Keith Richard (Northeast Louisiana)

Assistant coach(es)

- Ryan Cross (Buffalo)
- Ronnie Dean
- Sam Waniewski

Legend

- (C) Team captain
- (S) Suspended
- (I) Ineligible
- (W) Walk-on
- Injured
- Current redshirt

Roster
Last update: March 26, 2024

== Schedule and results ==
Date time, TV	Rank^{#}	Opponent^{#}	Result	Record	Site (attendance) city, state
Non-conference regular season
November 11, 2018*; 7:00 pm		at Jackson State	W 75–66	1–0	Williams Assembly Center (904); Jackson, MS
November 10, 2018*; 12:00 pm		Millsaps	W 94–52	2–0	Fant–Ewing Coliseum (1,213); Monroe, LA
November 12, 2018*; 7:00 pm, LHN		at Texas; Las Vegas Invitational campus game	L 55–65	2–1	Frank Erwin Center (7,453); Austin, TX
November 14, 2018*; 6:00 pm, BTN		at No. 11 Michigan State; Las Vegas Invitational Campus Game	L 59–80	2–2	Breslin Center (14,797); East Lansing, MI
November 23, 2018*; 6:00 pm		at Tennessee Tech	L 73–79	2–3	Eblen Center (896); Cookeville, TN
November 27, 2018*; 6:30 pm		at Northwestern State	W 80–52	3–3	Prather Coliseum (1,305); Natchitoches, LA
December 1, 2018*; 1:00 pm, SECN+		at Ole Miss	L 60–83	3–4	The Pavilion at Ole Miss (6,128); Oxford, MS
December 11, 2018*; 7:00 pm		Grambling State	W 72–67	4–4	Fant–Ewing Coliseum (1,601); Monroe, LA
December 15, 2018*; 2:00 pm		Stephen F. Austin	W 74–58	5–4	Fant–Ewing Coliseum (2,057); Monroe, LA
December 18, 2018*; 7:00 pm		Nicholls	W 95–68	6–4	Fant–Ewing Coliseum (1,812); Monroe, LA
December 21, 2018*; 7:00 pm		Coppin State	W 80–63	7–4	Fant–Ewing Coliseum (1,427); Monroe, LA
December 28, 2018*; 7:00 pm, SECN+		at LSU	L 69–81	7–5	Pete Maravich Assembly Center (10,028); Baton Rouge, LA
Sun Belt Conference regular season
January 3, 2019; 7:00 pm, ESPN+		Little Rock	W 97–84	8–5 (1–0)	Fant–Ewing Coliseum (1,618); Monroe, LA
January 3, 2019; 2:00 pm, ESPN+		Arkansas State	W 85–75	9–5 (2–0)	Fant–Ewing Coliseum (2,373); Monroe, LA
January 10, 2019; 6:00 pm		at Georgia Southern	L 78–79	9–6 (2–1)	Hanner Fieldhouse (1,282); Statesboro, GA
January 12, 2019; 12:00 pm, ESPN+		at Georgia State	L 73–74	9–7 (2–2)	GSU Sports Arena (1,566); Atlanta, GA
January 19, 2019; 2:00 pm, ESPN+		Louisiana	W 99–95	10–7 (3–2)	Fant–Ewing Coliseum (4,317); Monroe, LA
January 24, 2019; 7:00 pm, ESPN+		Troy	W 75–69	11–7 (4–2)	Fant–Ewing Coliseum (5,107); Monroe, LA
January 26, 2019; 2:00 pm, ESPN+		South Alabama	L 72–78	11–8 (4–3)	Fant–Ewing Coliseum (5,206); Monroe, LA
January 31, 2019; 6:00 pm, ESPN+		at Coastal Carolina	L 81–92	11–9 (4–4)	HTC Center (1,035); Conway, SC
February 2, 2019; 1:00 pm, ESPN+		at Appalachian State	L 84–85	11–10 (4–5)	Holmes Center (1,403); Boone, NC
February 6, 2019; 7:00 pm, ESPN+		Georgia State	W 82–76	12–10 (5–5)	Fant–Ewing Coliseum (2,391); Monroe, LA
February 8, 2019; 7:00 pm, ESPN+		Georgia Southern	W 88–79	13–10 (6–5)	Fant–Ewing Coliseum (5,366); Monroe, LA
February 16, 2019; 7:00 pm, ESPN+		at Louisiana	L 76–83	13–11 (6–6)	Cajundome (5,041); Lafayette, LA
February 21, 2019; 7:00 pm, ESPN+		at Texas State	W 63–60	14–11 (7–6)	Strahan Coliseum (4,342); San Marcos, TX
February 23, 2019; 2:00 pm, ESPN+		at UT Arlington	L 86–91 ^{2OT}	14–12 (7–7)	College Park Center (1,817); Arlington, TX
February 28, 2019; 7:00 pm, ESPN+		Appalachian State	W 81–75	15–12 (8–7)	Fant–Ewing Coliseum (3,104); Monroe, LA
March 2, 2019; 2:00 pm, ESPN+		Coastal Carolina	L 91–97	15–13 (8–8)	Fant–Ewing Coliseum (2,936); Monroe, LA
March 7, 2019; 7:00 pm, ESPN+		at Arkansas State	L 72–73	15–14 (8–9)	First National Bank Arena (1,573); Jonesboro, AR
March 9, 2019; 3:00 pm, ESPN+		at Little Rock	W 79–62	16–14 (9–9)	Jack Stephens Center (1,407); Little Rock, AR
Sun Belt tournament
March 12, 2019; 7:00 pm, ESPN+	(7)	(10) Appalachian State; First round	W 89–80	17–14	Fant–Ewing Coliseum (4,522); Monroe, LA
March 14, 2019; 7:30 pm, ESPN+	(7)	vs. (6) Coastal Carolina; Second round	W 80–50	18–14	Lakefront Arena; New Orleans, LA
March 15, 2019; 7:30 pm, ESPN+	(7)	vs. (3) Georgia Southern; Quarterfinals	L 67–81	18–15	Lakefront Arena; New Orleans, LA
CollegeInsider.com Postseason Tournament
March 21, 2019*; 7:00 pm		Kent State; First round – Lou Henson Classic	W 87–77	19–15	Fant–Ewing Coliseum (5,742); Monroe, LA
March 28, 2019*; 7:00 pm		Texas Southern; Quarterfinals	L 102–108 ^{3OT}	19–16	Fant–Ewing Coliseum (6,004); Monroe, LA
*Non-conference game. ^{#}Rankings from AP poll. (#) Tournament seedings in parentheses. All times are in Central Time.
