= 2018–19 Georgia Southern Eagles men's basketball team =

American college basketball season

2018–19 Georgia Southern Eagles men's basketball

Islands of the Bahamas Showcase champion
- Conference: Sun Belt Conference
- Record: 21–12 (12–6 Sun Belt)
- Head coach: Mark Byington (6th season)
- Assistant coaches: Andrew Wilson; Larry Dixon; Ben Betts
- Home arena: Hanner Fieldhouse

2018–19 Sun Belt Conference men's basketball standings
	Conf.				Overall
Team	W		L	PCT	W		L	PCT
Georgia State †	13	–	5	.722	24	–	10	.706
UT Arlington	12	–	6	.667	17	–	16	.515
Georgia Southern	12	–	6	.667	21	–	12	.636
Texas State	12	–	6	.667	24	–	10	.706
Louisiana	10	–	8	.556	19	–	13	.594
Coastal Carolina	9	–	9	.500	17	–	17	.500
Louisiana–Monroe	9	–	9	.500	19	–	16	.543
South Alabama	8	–	10	.444	17	–	17	.500
Arkansas State	7	–	11	.389	13	–	19	.406
Appalachian State	6	–	12	.333	11	–	21	.344
Little Rock	5	–	13	.278	10	–	21	.323
Troy	5	–	13	.278	12	–	18	.400
† 2019 Sun Belt Conference tournament winner

The 2018–19 Georgia Southern Eagles men's basketball team represented Georgia Southern University during the 2018–19 NCAA Division I men's basketball season. The Eagles, led by sixth-year head coach Mark Byington, played their home games at Hanner Fieldhouse in Statesboro, Georgia as members of the Sun Belt Conference. They finished the season 21–12, 12-6 in Sun Belt play to finish in a 3-way tie for second place. They defeated Louisiana–Monroe in the quarterfinals of the Sun Belt tournament before losing in the semifinals to UT Arlington. Despite having 21 wins, they did not participate in a postseason tournament.

== Previous season ==
The Eagles finished the 2017–18 season 21–12, 11–7 in Sun Belt play to finish in third place. They defeated Louisiana–Monroe in the quarterfinals of the Sun Belt tournament before losing in the semifinals to Georgia State. Despite having 21 wins, they did not participate in a postseason tournament.

== Roster ==
2018–19 Georgia Southern Eagles men's basketball team
Players
Coaches

Pos.	#	Name	Height	Weight	Year	Hometown
F	0	Montae Glenn	6 ft 8 in (2.03 m)	230 lb (104 kg)	Jr	Carrollton, Georgia
G	1	Jared Hamilton	6 ft 4 in (1.93 m)	190 lb (86 kg)	RS So	Charlotte, North Carolina
G	2	Mike Hughes	6 ft 3 in (1.91 m)	190 lb (86 kg)	Sr	Winston-Salem, North Carolina
G	3	Ike Smith	6 ft 4 in (1.93 m)	210 lb (95 kg)	Jr	Gainesville, Florida
G	4	Tookie Brown	5 ft 11 in (1.8 m)	180 lb (82 kg)	Sr	Madison, Georgia
F	5	B. J. Gladden	6 ft 6 in (1.98 m)	210 lb (95 kg)	Sr	Charlotte, North Carolina
G	10	Jake Allsmiller	6 ft 5 in (1.96 m)	185 lb (84 kg)	Sr	Nashville, Tennessee
F	11	Shawn O'Connell	6 ft 8 in (2.03 m)	210 lb (95 kg)	RS Jr	Roswell, Georgia
G	13	Quan Jackson	6 ft 4 in (1.93 m)	180 lb (82 kg)	RS Fr	Tallahassee, Florida
F	14	Coye Simmons	6 ft 8 in (2.03 m)	240 lb (109 kg)	Sr	Winston-Salem, North Carolina
G	21	Eito Yuminami	5 ft 6 in (1.68 m)	140 lb (64 kg)	Fr	Mooresville, North Carolina
F	23	Simeon Carter	6 ft 8 in (2.03 m)	215 lb (98 kg)	Jr	Charlotte, North Carolina
G	24	David-Lee Jones, Jr.	6 ft 0 in (1.83 m)	160 lb (73 kg)	So	Tampa, Florida
F	25	David Georgiev	6 ft 7 in (2.01 m)	200 lb (91 kg)	So	Skopje, Macedonia
G	30	DeDe Reynolds	5 ft 11 in (1.8 m)	165 lb (75 kg)	Jr	Madison, Georgia
C	35	Tyshaun Crawford	7 ft 1 in (2.16 m)	270 lb (122 kg)	Fr	Griffin, Georgia
F	53	Isaiah Crawley	6 ft 7 in (2.01 m)	210 lb (95 kg)	Jr	Ripley, Tennessee

Head coach

- Mark Byington (UNC Wilmington)

Assistant coach(es)

- Andrew Wilson (Florida State)
- Larry Dixon (Johnson C. Smith)
- Ben Betts (Roanoke)

Legend

- (C) Team captain
- (S) Suspended
- (I) Ineligible
- (W) Walk-on
- Injured
- Current redshirt

Roster
Last update: June 25, 2021

== Schedule and results ==
Date time, TV	Rank^{#}	Opponent^{#}	Result	Record	Site (attendance) city, state
Exhibition
Oct 30*; 7:00 pm		Charleston Southern	W 79–61		Hanner Fieldhouse (1,538); Statesboro, GA
Non-conference regular season
Nov 7*; 7:00 pm		Carver College; Islands of the Bahamas Showcase campus game	W 139–51	1–0	Hanner Fieldhouse (1,214); Statesboro, GA
Nov 13*; 7:00 pm		George Mason; ESPN+	W 98–89	2–0	Hanner Fieldhouse (2,638); Statesboro, GA
Nov 16*; 5:00 pm		vs. Florida Atlantic; Islands of the Bahamas Showcase quarterfinals	W 80–70	3–0	Kendal Isaacs National Gymnasium (247); Nassau, Bahamas
Nov 17*; 5:00 pm		vs. Pepperdine; Islands of the Bahamas Showcase semifinals	W 88–78	4–0	Kendal Isaacs National Gymnasium (523); Nassau, Bahamas
Nov 18*; 8:00 pm		vs. Montana; Islands of the Bahamas Showcase championship	W 80–77	5–0	Kendal Isaacs National Gymnasium (634); Nassau, Bahamas
Nov 27*; 7:00 pm		East Tennessee State; ESPN+	L 64–69	5–1	Hanner Fieldhouse (2,256); Statesboro, GA
Nov 29*; 9:00 pm, P12N		at Arizona	L 70–100	5–2	McKale Center (13,486); Tucson, AZ
Dec 8*; 4:00 pm, ESPN3		at Mercer	W 89–74	6–2	Hawkins Arena (3,272); Macon, GA
Dec 11*; 7:00 pm, ESPN3		at UCF	L 88–95	6–3	CFE Arena (3,632); Orlando, FL
Dec 14*; 7:00 pm		Brewton–Parker	W 101–64	7–3	Hanner Fieldhouse (1,019); Statesboro, GA
Dec 18*; 7:30 pm		Bradley	W 79–74 ^{OT}	8–3	Hanner Fieldhouse (1,507); Statesboro, GA
Dec 21*; 6:00 pm, ESPN+		at Radford	L 68–80	8–4	Dedmon Center (1,012); Radford, VA
Dec 29*; 3:30 pm, NBCSN		at Dayton	L 90–94	8–5	UD Arena (13,147); Dayton, OH
Sun Belt Conference regular season
Jan 3; 8:00 pm, ESPN+		at Texas State	L 70–73	8–6 (0–1)	Strahan Coliseum (1,517); San Marcos, TX
Jan 5; 3:00 pm, ESPN+		at UT Arlington	W 77–64	9–6 (1–1)	College Park Center (1,530); Arlington, TX
Jan 10; 7:00 pm		Louisiana–Monroe	W 79–78	10–6 (2–1)	Hanner Fieldhouse (1,282); Statesboro, GA
Jan 12; 5:00 pm, ESPN+		Louisiana	L 85–87	10–7 (2–2)	Hanner Fieldhouse (2,326); Statesboro, GA
Jan 17; 8:00 pm, ESPN+		at Troy	W 90–82	11–7 (3–2)	Trojan Arena (3,021); Troy, AL
Jan 19; 4:00 pm, ESPN+		at South Alabama	W 88–86 ^{OT}	12–7 (4–2)	Mitchell Center (1,885); Mobile, AL
Jan 24; 7:00 pm, ESPN+		UT Arlington	L 67–72	12–8 (4–3)	Hanner Fieldhouse (2,357); Statesboro, GA
Jan 26; 5:00 pm		Texas State	W 74–58	13–8 (5–3)	Hanner Fieldhouse (2,414); Statesboro, GA
Feb 2; 1:00 pm, ESPN+		at Georgia State	L 72–81	13–9 (5–4)	GSU Sports Arena (3,854); Atlanta, GA
Feb 6; 8:00 pm, ESPN+		at Louisiana	W 103–86	14–9 (6–4)	Cajundome (3,562); Lafayette, LA
Feb 8; 8:00 pm, ESPN+		at Louisiana–Monroe	L 79–88	14–10 (6–5)	Fant–Ewing Coliseum (5,366); Monroe, LA
Feb 13; 7:00 pm, ESPN+		South Alabama	W 75–65	15–10 (7–5)	Hanner Fieldhouse (1,321); Statesboro, GA
Feb 15; 9:00 pm, ESPN2		Troy	W 76–51	16–10 (8–5)	Hanner Fieldhouse (2,349); Statesboro, GA
Feb 21; 7:00 pm, ESPN+		at Coastal Carolina	W 79–74	17–10 (9–5)	HTC Center (1,483); Conway, SC
Feb 23; 2:00 pm, ESPN+		at Appalachian State	W 92–69	18–10 (10–5)	Holmes Center (1,722); Boone, North Carolina
Feb 28; 7:00 pm, ESPN+		Little Rock	W 81–66	19–10 (11–5)	Hanner Fieldhouse (1,265); Statesboro, GA
Mar 2; 5:00 pm, ESPN+		Arkansas State	W 81–70	20–10 (12–5)	Hanner Fieldhouse (1,986); Statesboro, GA
Mar 9; 5:00 pm, ESPN+		Georgia State	L 85–90	20–11 (12–6)	Hanner Fieldhouse (3,987); Statesboro, GA
Sun Belt tournament
Mar 15; 8:30 pm, ESPN+	(3)	vs. (7) Louisiana-Monroe; Quarterfinals	W 81–67	21–11	Lakefront Arena; New Orleans, LA
Mar 16; 6:30 pm, ESPN+	(3)	vs. (2) UT Arlington; Semifinals	L 58–67	21–12	Lakefront Arena; New Orleans, LA
*Non-conference game. ^{#}Rankings from AP Poll. (#) Tournament seedings in parentheses. All times are in Eastern Time.
