= Malik Benlevi =

American basketball player (born 1997)

No. 7 – Earthfriends Tokyo Z
- Position: Small forward
- League: B.League

Personal information
- Born: March 20, 1997 (age 28); Savannah, Georgia, U.S.
- Listed height: 6 ft 6 in (1.98 m)
- Listed weight: 225 lb (102 kg)

Career information
- High school: Jenkins (Savannah, Georgia)
- College: Georgia State (2015–2019)
- NBA draft: 2019: undrafted
- Playing career: 2019–present

Career history
- 2019: Ostioneros de Guaymas
- 2019–2021: Salt Lake City Stars
- 2021–2022: Iowa Wolves
- 2022–2023: Saskatchewan Rattlers
- 2022–2023: BC Nokia
- 2024: Wellington Saints
- 2024–present: Earthfriends Tokyo Z

Career highlights and awards
- Sun Belt tournament Most Outstanding Player (2019)

Malik Ammon Benlevi (born March 20, 1997) is an American professional basketball player for the Earthfriends Tokyo Z of the B.League. He played college basketball player for the Georgia State Panthers.

== High school career ==
Benlevi attended Jenkins High School in Savannah, Georgia. He averaged 13.8 points, 5.6 rebounds, 2.0 steals and 1.5 assists per game as a junior. Benlevi led the team to a Region 3-AAAAA title and to the Class AAAAA Final Four, and was an All-Savannah Morning News first-team selection. As a senior, he averaged 16.7 points and 6.2 rebounds per game, earning Region 1-AAA Player of the Year as well as all-state first-team honors from the Atlanta Journal-Constitution. Benlevi led Jenkins to its first state championship, scoring 12 points in the title game against Morgan County High School. He committed to play college basketball at Georgia State over offers from South Carolina State and Kennesaw State.

== College career ==
Benlevi rarely played as a freshman, but averaged 8.5 points and 4.2 rebounds per game as a sophomore. As a junior, he averaged 9.6 points, 6.5 rebounds and 1.7 assists per game. During his senior season, Benlevi frequently played center due to injuries to the team's big men. In the championship game of the Sun Belt Conference tournament, he scored 16 points and grabbed 11 rebounds in a 73–64 win against UT Arlington, and he was named Most Outstanding Player. Benlevi averaged 11.9 points and 5.8 rebounds per game.

== Professional career ==
=== Ostioneros de Guaymas (2019) ===
After going undrafted in the 2019 NBA draft, Benlevi signed his first professional contract with Ostioneros de Guaymas of the Mexican Circuito de Baloncesto de la Costa del Pacífico. He averaged 11.4 points, 5.7 rebounds and 1.2 assists per game.

=== Salt Lake City Stars (2019–2021) ===
In October 2019, Benlevi joined the Salt Lake City Stars of the NBA G League. During the 2019–20 season, he averaged 5.8 points, 3.2 rebounds, 1.4 assists, and 18.5 minutes in 37 games. During the G League hub season between February and March 2021, he averaged 7.7 points, 3.4 rebounds, 1 assist, and 19.7 minutes in 11 games.

=== Iowa Wolves (2021–2022) ===
After initially signing with Grindavík of the Icelandic league, Benlevi joined the Iowa Wolves for the 2021–22 NBA G League season. He was waived on February 28, 2022, and then reacquired by the team on March 10. He averaged 6.4 points, 3.9 rebounds, 0.7 assists, and 16.1 minutes in 27 games while setting his career-high at 5 blocks per game.

=== Saskatchewan Rattlers and BC Nokia (2022–2023) ===
On April 12, 2022, Benlevi signed with the Saskatchewan Rattlers of the CEBL.

For the 2022–23 season, Benlevi played for BC Nokia in Finland. He then returned to the Rattlers for the 2023 CEBL season.

=== Wellington Saints (2024) ===
On March 22, 2024, Benlevi signed with the Wellington Saints of the New Zealand National Basketball League (NZNBL) for the 2024 season.

=== Earthfriends Tokyo Z (2024–present) ===
On August 5, 2024, Benlevi signed with the Earthfriends Tokyo Z of the B.League.
