= 2017–18 Louisiana Ragin' Cajuns men's basketball team =

American college basketball season

2017–18 Louisiana Ragin' Cajuns men's basketball

Sun Belt Regular Season Champions

NIT, First Round
- Conference: Sun Belt Conference
- Record: 27–7 (16–2 Sun Belt)
- Head coach: Bob Marlin (8th season)
- Assistant coaches: Neil Hardin; Kevin Johnson; Josten Crow
- Home arena: Cajundome

2017–18 Sun Belt Conference men's basketball standings
	Conf.				Overall
Team	W		L	PCT	W		L	PCT
Louisiana	16	–	2	.889	27	–	7	.794
Georgia State †	12	–	6	.667	24	–	11	.686
Georgia Southern	11	–	7	.611	21	–	12	.636
Texas–Arlington	10	–	8	.556	21	–	13	.618
Louisiana–Monroe	9	–	9	.500	16	–	16	.500
Troy	9	–	9	.500	16	–	17	.485
Appalachian State	9	–	9	.500	15	–	18	.455
Coastal Carolina	8	–	10	.444	14	–	18	.438
South Alabama	7	–	11	.389	14	–	18	.438
Texas State	7	–	11	.389	15	–	18	.455
Arkansas State	6	–	12	.333	11	–	21	.344
Little Rock	4	–	14	.222	7	–	25	.219
† 2018 Sun Belt Conference tournament winner

The 2017–18 Louisiana Ragin' Cajuns men's basketball team represented the University of Louisiana at Lafayette during the 2017–18 NCAA Division I men's basketball season. The Ragin' Cajuns were led by eighth-year head coach Bob Marlin and played their home games at the Cajundome as members in the Sun Belt Conference. They finished the season 27–7, 16–2 in Sun Belt play to win the Sun Belt regular season championship. The conference championship was the school's first since first regular-season title since sharing the 2000 title and its first outright title since joining the conference in 1991. They defeated Texas State in the quarterfinals of the Sun Belt tournament before losing in the semifinals to Texas–Arlington. As a regular season conference champion who failed to win their conference tournament, they received an automatic bid to the National Invitation Tournament where they lost in the first round to LSU.

Head coach Bob Marlin sparked controversy after it was announced that the Cajuns would play in-state rival LSU in the NIT, believing the Cajuns were the better team and should have been given home-court advantage. He also said of LSU, "Sometimes, a team that tied for ninth in their league isn’t interested in playing. But they haven’t been very good for a couple of years, so the NIT is a big step for them." Late in the game, which LSU won, Marlin and LSU head coach Will Wade had to be restrained while yelling at each other.

== Previous season ==
The Ragin' Cajuns finished the 2016–17 season 21–12, 10–8 in Sun Belt play to finish in a three-way tie for sixth place. They defeated Little Rock in the first round of the Sun Belt tournament before losing to Georgia State in the quarterfinals. They did not participate in a postseason tournament.

== Offseason ==
=== Departures ===
Name	Number	Pos.	Height	Weight	Year	Hometown	Notes
Roydell Brown	25	G	6'5"	184	Freshman	New Orleans, Louisiana	Transferred to Southwest Mississippi Community College
Jay Wright	1	F	6'1"	170	Senior	Rincon, Georgia	Graduated

=== Incoming recruits ===
College recruiting information
Name	Hometown	School	Height	Weight	Commit date
Elijah McCoy; PF	Fresno, California	Roosevelt High School	6 ft 9 in (2.06 m)	235 lb (107 kg)	Jun 9, 2017
Elijah McCoy; PF	Recruit ratings: Scout: Rivals: 247Sports: (0)				
Cedric Russell #60 SG	New Orleans, Louisiana	Peabody Magnet High School	6 ft 3 in (1.91 m)	185 lb (84 kg)	Oct 28, 2016
Cedric Russell #60 SG	Recruit ratings: Scout: Rivals: 247Sports: (76)				
Overall recruit ranking:
Note: In many cases, Scout, Rivals, 247Sports, On3, and ESPN may conflict in their listings of height and weight.; In these cases, the average was taken. ESPN grades are on a 100-point scale.; Sources: "Louisiana 2017 Player Commits". ESPN.; "2017 Team Ranking". Rivals.

== Roster ==
2017–18 Louisiana Ragin' Cajuns men's basketball team
Players
Coaches

Pos.	#	Name	Height	Weight	Year	Hometown
F	0	Cedric Russell	6 ft 2 in (1.88 m)	185 lb (84 kg)	Fr	Alexandria, Louisiana
G	1	Malik Marquetti	6 ft 6 in (1.98 m)	191 lb (87 kg)	RS Jr	Compton, California
F	3	Justin Miller	6 ft 7 in (2.01 m)	251 lb (114 kg)	So	Owensboro, Kentucky
G	4	Frank Bartley	6 ft 3 in (1.91 m)	214 lb (97 kg)	Sr	Baton Rouge, Louisiana
G	5	Kadavion Evans	5 ft 11 in (1.8 m)	160 lb (73 kg)	RS So	Shreveport, Louisiana
F	11	Jerekius Davis	6 ft 6 in (1.98 m)	222 lb (101 kg)	RS So	Jackson, Mississippi
G	13	Jacob Broussard	5 ft 10 in (1.78 m)	164 lb (74 kg)	Sr	Lafayette, Louisiana
G	15	P.J. Hardy	6 ft 1 in (1.85 m)	170 lb (77 kg)	So	Lake Charles, Louisiana
F	23	JaKeenan Gant	6 ft 8 in (2.03 m)	205 lb (93 kg)	RS Jr	Springfield, Georgia
G	30	Jonathan Stove	6 ft 4 in (1.93 m)	224 lb (102 kg)	Sr	Baton Rouge, Louisiana
G	31	Mason Aucoin	6 ft 4 in (1.93 m)	172 lb (78 kg)	So	Luling, Louisiana
F	32	Bryce Washington	6 ft 6 in (1.98 m)	245 lb (111 kg)	Sr	New Orleans, Louisiana
C	33	Larenz Stalcup	6 ft 11 in (2.11 m)	233 lb (106 kg)	Sr	Colorado Springs, Colorado
G	35	Marcus Stroman	6 ft 2 in (1.88 m)	183 lb (83 kg)	RS Jr	Columbia, South Carolina
F	55	Elijah McCoy	6 ft 9 in (2.06 m)	235 lb (107 kg)	Fr	Fresno, California

Head coach

- Bob Marlin (Mississippi State)

Assistant coach(es)

- Neil Hardin (West Florida)
- Kevin Johnson (Texas–Pan American)
- Josten Crow (Sam Houston State)

Legend

- (C) Team captain
- (S) Suspended
- (I) Ineligible
- (W) Walk-on
- Injured
- Current redshirt

Roster
Last update: July 22, 2017

== Schedule and results ==
Date time, TV	Rank^{#}	Opponent^{#}	Result	Record	High points	High rebounds	High assists	Site (attendance) city, state
Exhibition
Nov 2*; 7:00 pm		Millsaps	W 112–63		15 – Miller	10 – Washington	3 – Stalcup	Cajundome (1,474); Lafayette, LA
Non-conference regular season
Nov 10*; 7:30 pm, SECN Plus		at Ole Miss	L 76–94	0–1	16 – Stove	8 – Gant	5 – Stroman	The Pavilion at Ole Miss (8,302); Oxford, MS
Nov 14*; 7:00 pm		Louisiana College	W 113–58	1–1	19 – Hardy	9 – Gant	5 – Hardy	Cajundome (3,474); Lafayette, LA
Nov 17*; 4:00 pm		Savannah State	W 115–82	2–1	21 – Bartley	15 – Washington	11 – Stroman	Cajundome (3,096); Lafayette, LA
Nov 20*; 11:00 am		vs. Iowa; Cayman Islands Classic quarterfinals	W 80–71	3–1	17 – Bartley	10 – Washington	11 – Stroman	John Gray High School (1,200); George Town, Cayman Islands
Nov 21*; 1:30 pm		vs. Wyoming; Cayman Islands Classic semifinals	L 61–70	3–2	19 – Bartley	9 – Gant	3 – Marquetti	John Gray High School (654); George Town, Cayman Islands
Nov 22*; 4:00 pm		vs. Richmond; Cayman Islands Classic 3rd place game	W 82–76	4–2	23 – Bartley	13 – Washington	7 – Stroman	John Gray High School (850); George Town, Cayman Islands
Nov 28*; 7:00 pm		McNeese State	W 89–78	5–2	17 – Marquetti	12 – Washington	4 – Bartley	Cajundome (3,489); Lafayette, LA
Dec 1*; 7:00 pm		at Nicholls State	W 105–80	6–2	23 – Stove	12 – Washington	7 – Stove	Stopher Gym (733); Thibodaux, LA
Dec 6*; 7:00 pm		Loyola–New Orleans	W 98–56	7–2	23 – Gant	13 – Washington	4 – Miller	Cajundome (3,190); Lafayette, LA
Dec 12*; 6:30 pm		at Louisiana Tech	W 75–71	8–2	22 – Gant	10 – Washington	9 – Stroman	Thomas Assembly Center (3,438); Ruston, LA
Dec 16*; 7:00 pm		New Orleans	W 87–65	9–2	21 – Gant	11 – Gant	7 – Stroman	Cajundome (3,445); Lafayette, LA
Dec 19*; 7:00 pm		Southeastern Louisiana	W 82–74	10–2	14 – Gant	12 – Gant	5 – Washington	Cajundome (3,323); Lafayette, LA
Dec 22*; 2:00 pm, ACCN Extra		at Clemson	L 60–89	10–3	16 – Stroman	6 – Bartley	3 – Stroman	Littlejohn Coliseum (8,847); Clemson, SC
Sun Belt regular season
Dec 29; 7:00 pm		at Little Rock	W 77–63	11–3 (1–0)	20 – Gant	19 – Washington	5 – Stroman	Jack Stephens Center (1,688); Little Rock, AR
Dec 31; 3:30 pm		at Arkansas State	W 88–78	12–3 (2–0)	23 – Bartley	11 – Washington	10 – Stroman	First National Bank Arena (2,076); Jonesboro, AR
Jan 4, 2018; 7:15 pm		Appalachian State	W 78–45	13–3 (3–0)	16 – Bartley	10 – Washington	4 – Stroman	Cajundome (4,329); Lafayette, LA
Jan 6; 7:00 pm		Coastal Carolina	W 81–64	14–3 (4–0)	22 – Bartley	12 – Washington	6 – Washington	Cajundome (4,150); Lafayette, LA
Jan 13; 7:00 pm		Louisiana–Monroe	W 82–48	15–3 (5–0)	12 – Bartley	12 – Washington	10 – Stroman	Cajundome (5,813); Lafayette, LA
Jan 18; 7:15 pm, ESPN3		at Texas–Arlington	W 77–65	16–3 (6–0)	26 – Bartley	16 – Washington	6 – Stroman	College Park Center (2,384); Arlington, TX
Jan 20; 7:00 pm, ESPN3		at Texas State	W 80–55	17–3 (7–0)	19 – Marquetti	9 – Washington	6 – Stroman	Strahan Coliseum (3,222); San Marcos, TX
Jan 25; 7:15 pm		South Alabama	W 76–57	18–3 (8–0)	21 – Marquetti	16 – Washington	5 – Stroman	Cajundome (5,036); Lafayette, LA
Jan 27; 2:00 pm		Troy	W 81–69	19–3 (9–0)	24 – Gant	9 – Washington	5 – Bartley	Cajundome (4,865); Lafayette, LA
Feb 3; 2:00 pm, ESPN3		at Louisiana–Monroe	W 80–53	20–3 (10–0)	22 – Bartley	9 – Washington	7 – Stroman	Fant–Ewing Coliseum (2,269); Monroe, LA
Feb 8; 6:15 pm, ESPN3		at Georgia State	L 92–106	20–4 (10–1)	21 – Bartley	8 – Stroman	15 – Stroman	GSU Sports Arena (2,065); Atlanta, GA
Feb 10; 4:00 pm, ESPN3		at Georgia Southern	W 102–91	21–4 (11–1)	28 – Stove	13 – Washington	8 – Stroman	Hanner Fieldhouse (2,687); Statesboro, GA
Feb 15; 7:15 pm		Texas State	W 73–63	22–4 (12–1)	19 – Washington	10 – Washington	11 – Stroman	Cajundome (4,382); Lafayette, LA
Feb 17; 7:00 pm		Texas–Arlington	W 100–79	23–4 (13–1)	25 – Bartley	10 – Washington	6 – Washington	Cajundome (5,104); Lafayette, LA
Feb 22; 7:15 pm, ESPN3		at Troy	W 81–76	24–4 (14–1)	22 – Bartley	10 – Washington	4 – Stove	Trojan Arena (2,236); Troy, AL
Feb 24; 7:05 pm		at South Alabama	W 88–71	25–4 (15–1)	20 – Davis	13 – Washington	4 – Stroman	Mitchell Center (1,946); Mobile, AL
Mar 1; 7:15 pm		Arkansas State	W 85–74	26–4 (16–1)	18 – Bartley	7 – Washington	8 – Stroman	Cajundome (4,307); Lafayette, LA
Mar 3; 7:00 pm		Little Rock	L 61–72	26–5 (16–2)	17 – Gant	14 – Washington	8 – Stroman	Cajundome (5,275); Lafayette, LA
Sun Belt tournament
Mar 9; 11:30 am, ESPN3	(1)	vs. (9) Texas State; Quarterfinals	W 80–54	27–5	23 – Bartley	8 – Washington	8 – Stroman	Lakefront Arena (2,170); New Orleans, LA
Mar 10; 11:30 am, ESPN3	(1)	vs. (4) Texas–Arlington; Semifinals	L 68–71	27–6	19 – Bartley	10 – Washington	7 – Stroman	Lakefront Arena (2,811); New Orleans, LA
NIT
Mar 14*; 6:00 pm, ESPN3	(6)	at (3) LSU; First round – Saint Mary's Bracket	L 76–84	27–7	21 – Bartley	13 – Stroman	7 – Stroman	Maravich Center (6,846); Baton Rouge, LA
*Non-conference game. ^{#}Rankings from AP Poll. (#) Tournament seedings in parentheses. All times are in Central Time.
