= 2017–18 Georgia State Panthers men's basketball team =

American college basketball season

2017–18 Georgia State Panthers men's basketball

Sun Belt tournament champions

NCAA tournament, First Round
- Conference: Sun Belt Conference
- Record: 24–11 (12–6 Sun Belt)
- Head coach: Ron Hunter (7th season)
- Assistant coaches: Sharman White (2nd season); Ray McCallum (2nd season); Claude Pardue (7th season)
- Home arena: GSU Sports Arena

2017–18 Sun Belt Conference men's basketball standings
	Conf.				Overall
Team	W		L	PCT	W		L	PCT
Louisiana	16	–	2	.889	27	–	7	.794
Georgia State †	12	–	6	.667	24	–	11	.686
Georgia Southern	11	–	7	.611	21	–	12	.636
Texas–Arlington	10	–	8	.556	21	–	13	.618
Louisiana–Monroe	9	–	9	.500	16	–	16	.500
Troy	9	–	9	.500	16	–	17	.485
Appalachian State	9	–	9	.500	15	–	18	.455
Coastal Carolina	8	–	10	.444	14	–	18	.438
South Alabama	7	–	11	.389	14	–	18	.438
Texas State	7	–	11	.389	15	–	18	.455
Arkansas State	6	–	12	.333	11	–	21	.344
Little Rock	4	–	14	.222	7	–	25	.219
† 2018 Sun Belt Conference tournament winner

The 2017–18 Georgia State Panthers men's basketball team represented Georgia State University during the 2017–18 NCAA Division I men's basketball season. The team's head coach was Ron Hunter, who was in his seventh season at Georgia State. The Panthers played their home games at the GSU Sports Arena in Atlanta, Georgia as members of the Sun Belt Conference. They finished the season 24–11, 12–6 in Sun Belt play to finish the regular season in second place. The Panthers defeated Troy, Georgia Southern, and UT Arlington to become champions of the Sun Belt tournament. As a result, they received the Sun Belt's automatic bid to the NCAA tournament. As the No. 15 seed in the West region, they lost to Cincinnati in the first round.

== Previous season ==
The Panthers finished the 2016–17 season 20–13, 12–6 in Sun Belt play to finish in second place. They lost in the semifinals of the Sun Belt tournament to Troy before receiving an invitation to the CIT, where they lost to Texas A&M Corpus Christi.

== Offseason ==
=== Departures ===
Name	Number	Pos.	Height	Weight	Year	Hometown	Notes
Jeremy Hollowell	1	G	6'3"	160	Senior	Atlanta, GA	Graduated
Isaiah Dennis	4	G	6'0"	190	Senior	McDonough, GA	Graduated
Austin Donaldson	10	G	6'1"	185	Sophomore	Jonesboro, GA	Transferred out
Justin Seymour	20	G	6'3"	215	Senior	Atlanta, GA	Ineligible/Graduated
Willie Clayton	21	F	6'8"	245	Redshirt Senior	Thomasville, GA	Graduated
Carter Cagle	34	G	6'4"	200	Junior	Gainesville, GA	Graduated

=== Incoming transfers ===
Name	Number	Pos.	Height	Weight	Year	Hometown	Previous School
Damon Wilson	1	G	6'5"	195	Junior	Atlanta, GA	Pittsburgh. Under NCAA transfer rules, Wilson will have to sit out for the 2017–18 season, using a redshirt, leaving two years of eligibility remaining.

=== 2017 recruiting class ===
College recruiting information
Name	Hometown	School	Height	Weight	Commit date
Denis Alibegovic; G	Downers Grove, IL	Downers Grove South	6 ft 2 in (1.88 m)	170 lb (77 kg)	Apr 26, 2016
Denis Alibegovic; G	Recruit ratings: Scout: Rivals: 247Sports: ESPN: (N/A)				
Kane Williams; G	Douglasville, GA	South Paulding	6 ft 3 in (1.91 m)	185 lb (84 kg)	Oct 19, 2016
Kane Williams; G	Recruit ratings: Scout: Rivals: 247Sports: ESPN: (N/A)				
Josh Linder; F	Kathleen, GA	Veterans	6 ft 9 in (2.06 m)	215 lb (98 kg)	Sep 8, 2016
Josh Linder; F	Recruit ratings: Scout: Rivals: 247Sports: ESPN: (N/A)				
Matt Chism; G	Dawsonville, GA	Dawson Christian	6 ft 3 in (1.91 m)	185 lb (84 kg)	May 14, 2016
Matt Chism; G	Recruit ratings: Scout: Rivals: 247Sports: ESPN: (N/A)				
Overall recruit ranking: Scout: NA Rivals: NA ESPN: NA
Note: In many cases, Scout, Rivals, 247Sports, On3, and ESPN may conflict in their listings of height and weight.; In these cases, the average was taken. ESPN grades are on a 100-point scale.; Sources: "Georgia State Panthers". ESPN.; "2017 Team Ranking". Rivals.

== Roster ==
2017–18 Georgia State Panthers men's basketball team
Players
Coaches

Pos.	#	Name	Height	Weight	Year	Previous school	Hometown
G	0	Nile Felton (W)	6 ft 3 in (1.91 m)	175 lb (79 kg)	RS So	Union	Atlanta, GA
G	1	Damon Wilson (redshirt)	6 ft 5 in (1.96 m)	295 lb (134 kg)	Jr	Our Savior New American / Pittsburgh	New York, NY
G	2	Malik Benlevi (C)	6 ft 5 in (1.96 m)	205 lb (93 kg)	Jr	Jenkins	Savannah, GA
G	10	Denis Alibegovic	6 ft 2 in (1.88 m)	170 lb (77 kg)	Fr	Downers Grove South	Downers Grove, IL
G	11	Isaiah Williams	6 ft 2 in (1.88 m)	170 lb (77 kg)	Sr	Buford / Samford	Buford, GA
G	12	Kane Williams	6 ft 3 in (1.91 m)	185 lb (84 kg)	Fr	South Paulding	Douglasville, GA
F	14	Chris Clerkly	6 ft 9 in (2.06 m)	210 lb (95 kg)	So	Perry	Perry, GA
G	15	D'Marcus Simonds	6 ft 3 in (1.91 m)	200 lb (91 kg)	So	Gainesville	Gainesville, GA
F	20	Josh Linder	6 ft 9 in (2.06 m)	215 lb (98 kg)	Fr	Veterans	Kathleen, GA
F	23	Jordan Session (C)	6 ft 8 in (2.03 m)	225 lb (102 kg)	Sr	Eagle's Landing	McDonough, GA
G	24	Devin Mitchell	6 ft 4 in (1.93 m)	195 lb (88 kg)	RS Jr	Collins Hill / Alabama	Suwanee, GA
G	30	Jeff Thomas	6 ft 5 in (1.96 m)	190 lb (86 kg)	RS Jr	Norwalk	Norwalk, OH
G	35	Matt Chism (W)	6 ft 3 in (1.91 m)	185 lb (84 kg)	Fr	Dawson Christian Academy	Dawsonville, GA
F	50	Jordan Tyson	6 ft 10 in (2.08 m)	225 lb (102 kg)	RS Jr	Walnut Hills / St. Bonaventure	Cincinnati, OH

Head coach

- Ron Hunter (Miami (OH))

Assistant coach(es)

- Ray McCallum (Ball State)
- Sharman White (Georgia Southern)
- Claude Pardue (Emory)

Legend

- (C) Team captain
- (S) Suspended
- (I) Ineligible
- (W) Walk-on
- Injured
- Current redshirt

== Preseason ==
- Georgia State was picked to finish second in the Sun Belt Conference preseason coaches poll.
- Sophomore, D'Marcus Simonds, was named to the All-Sun Belt Preseason Second Team.
- On November 6, 2017, D'Marcus Simonds was named to the Lute Olson National Player of the Year Award preseason watchlist.

== Regular season ==
- During the November 10th game vs. Carver Bible College, D'Marcus Simonds became the first player in Georgia State history to earn a triple-double, scoring 20 points while adding 10 assists and 10 rebounds.
- On November 20, in a 68–50 win over Eastern Washington, Ron Hunter earned the 400th win of his career.
- D'Marcus Simonds was named to the Lute Olson National Player of the Year Award mid-season watchlist.
- On January 20, in an 83–66 win over Georgia Southern, Isaiah Williams scored his 1,000th career point.
- In a win at Little Rock on February 3, Devin Mitchell set a new scoring record for the Jack Stephens Center with his career-high 38 points.
- On March 5, D'Marcus Simonds was named Sun Belt Player of the Year, along with All-Sun Belt First Team honors. And junior, Devin Mitchell, was named to the All-Sun Belt Third Team.

== Post season ==
- On March 10, in GSU's semifinal win over Georgia Southern, Simonds scored his 689th point– breaking R. J. Hunter's single-season scoring record.
- After the 2018 Sun Belt Tournament, D'Marcus Simonds was named the Tournament MVP.
- D'Marcus Simonds and Isaiah Williams were named to the Sun Belt All-Tournament team.
- Sophomore, Simonds, was named the Georgia Men's College Co-Player of the Year.
- Simonds earned AP All-America Honorable Mention.
- Simonds was named to the Lou Henson All-America team and a finalist for the Lou Henson Award.
- Coach Ron Hunter was awarded the Gene Bartow Award.

=== Sun Belt Tournament ===
The Georgia State Men's Basketball team celebrates winning the Sun Belt Conference tournament

After locking in the second seed in the Sun Belt Tournament, the Panthers' performance dipped in the last part of their regular season– dropping four of their final six games. Able to shake free of that trend, Georgia State would beat Troy handily in the second round, 73–51, after losing to them twice in the regular season. In their semifinal game, the Panthers were once again pitted against in-state foe, Georgia Southern. The teams split their regular season contests– each winning at home. On this neutral court, GSU would defeat the Eagles 73–67 and eliminate their rival from the SBC Tournament for the second time in four years. This rivalry game wouldn't end without some theatrics– with less than a minute to play, Georgia Southern cut State's lead to just three points. The Panthers held the ball while the shot clock ran down to two seconds, at which point the Eagles were called for a kicked ball off of an attempted Georgia State pass. As a result, the shot clock would reset to 20 seconds– with just 23 seconds left on the game clock. The Panthers called a time out, where Coach Hunter said he reminded his team of the new shot clock differential and instructed them to hold the ball until fouled should they successfully inbound the ball. Once play resumed, the inbound pass was received by junior Devin Mitchell, who would later claim he thought Coach Hunter was talking about the game clock, and therefore still thought only two seconds remained on the shot clock, leading him to immediately turn around and shoot the ball from outside of the three-point arc and sink an unnecessary three-pointer. This mishap would ice the game, sending the Panthers to the SBC Tournament finals. Meanwhile, top-seeded (and regular season champions) Louisiana dropped their semifinal game to 5th seed UT-Arlington, sending the Mavericks, a team Georgia State lost to just five games earlier, to face the Panthers in the finals. The Panthers would handle UT-Arlington in the finals with relative ease, beating them 74–61, with the help of D'Marcus Simonds' game-high 27 points. Their SBC Tournament victory would give the Panthers the Sun Belt Conferences' automatic bid to the NCAA tournament. Selected as a 15-seed, Georgia State was matched with the 2nd-seeded Cincinnati Bearcats for their opening game in Nashville, TN.

== Schedule and results ==
Date time, TV	Rank^{#}	Opponent^{#}	Result	Record	High points	High rebounds	High assists	Site (attendance) city, state
Exhibition
October 28, 2017*; 12:00 pm		at Georgia Tech; A-Town Showdown	W 65–58		30 – Simonds	7 – Tied	4 – I. Williams	McCamish Pavilion (2,112); Atlanta, GA
November 2, 2017*; 7:00 pm		Lees-McRae	W 100–64		25 – Thomas	7 – Session	4 – Tied	GSU Sports Arena; Atlanta, GA
November 6, 2017*; 7:00 pm		Coker	W 99–65		31 – Simonds	11 – Session	8 – Simonds	GSU Sports Arena; Atlanta, GA
Non-conference regular season
November 10, 2017*; 7:00 pm, ESPN3		Carver Bible	W 90–50	1–0	20 – Simonds	10 – Simonds	10 – Simonds	GSU Sports Arena (1,349); Atlanta, GA
November 14, 2017*; 8:00 pm		at Rice; MGM Resorts Main Event campus-site game	W 75–54	2–0	18 – Thomas	7 – Simonds	7 – Simonds	Tudor Fieldhouse (1,208); Houston, TX
November 17, 2017*; 7:00 pm, SECN+		at Ole Miss; MGM Resorts Main Event campus-site game	L 72–77	2–1	29 – Simonds	9 – Thomas	5 – Simonds	The Pavilion at Ole Miss (6,835); Oxford, MS
November 20, 2017*; 4:30 pm		vs. Eastern Washington; MGM Resorts Main Event Middleweight semis	W 68–50	3–1	23 – Mitchell	7 – Benlevi	3 – Simonds	T-Mobile Arena; Paradise, NV
November 22, 2017*; 4:30 pm		vs. Prairie View A&M; MGM Resorts Main Event Middleweight finals	L 56–71	3–2	17 – Benlevi	6 – Benlevi	2 – Simonds	T-Mobile Arena; Paradise, NV
November 26, 2017*; 12:00 pm, ESPN3		Tulane	W 70–59	4–2	17 – Benlevi	10 – Tied	7 – K. Williams	GSU Sports Arena (971); Atlanta, GA
November 29, 2017*; 7:00 pm		Alabama A&M	W 63–53	5–2	15 – Simonds	10 – Simonds	5 – Simonds	Elmore Gymnasium (1,979); Huntsville, AL
December 4, 2017*; 7:00 pm, ESPN3		Liberty	L 74–77 ^{OT}	5–3	35 – Simonds	7 – Thomas	5 – Simonds	GSU Sports Arena (1,074); Atlanta, GA
December 9, 2017*; 2:00 pm, ESPN3		Montana	W 71–68	6–3	15 – Tied	8 – Thomas	3 – Tied	GSU Sports Arena (1,224); Atlanta, GA
December 12, 2017*; 7:00 pm, ESPN3		Point	W 90–70	7–3	33 – Simonds	9 – Benlevi	5 – Mitchell	GSU Sports Arena (914); Atlanta, GA
December 16, 2017*; 7:00 pm, Spectrum Sports		at Dayton	L 83–88 ^{OT}	7–4	28 – Mitchell	7 – Session	5 – Benlevi	UD Arena (13,005); Dayton, OH
December 20, 2017*; 7:00 pm		at UMass	W 71–63	8–4	24 – Simonds	9 – Simonds	5 – K. Williams	Mullins Center (2,004); Amherst, MA
December 23, 2017*; 1:00p pm, ESPN3		at Chattanooga	W 71–48	9–4	21 – Simonds	7 – Benlevi	6 – Simonds	McKenzie Arena (2,108); Chattanooga, TN
Sun Belt Conference regular season
December 29, 2017; 8:00 pm		at South Alabama	L 64–86	9–5 (0–2)	27 – Simonds	6 – Benlevi	3 – Benlevi	Mitchell Center (1,788); Mobile, AL
December 31, 2017; 4:15 pm, ESPN3		at Troy	L 66–68	9–6 (0–2)	17 – Simonds	6 – Simonds	6 – Simonds	Trojan Arena (1,835); Troy, AL
January 4, 2018; 7:15 pm, ESPN3		Little Rock	L 64–73	10–6 (1–2)	19 – Simonds	9 – Session	6 – Simonds	GSU Sports Arena (970); Atlanta, GA
January 6, 2018; 2:15 pm, ESPN3		Arkansas State	W 79–75	11–6 (2–2)	33 – Simonds	9 – Simonds	3 – I. Williams	GSU Sports Arena (1,187); Atlanta, GA
January 11, 2018; 7:30 pm		at Appalachian State	W 71–58	12–6 (3–2)	22 – Thomas	8 – Thomas	5 – Simonds	Holmes Center (701); Boone, NC
January 13, 2018; 3:30 pm		at Coastal Carolina	W 72–58	13–6 (4–2)	15 – Mitchell	11 – Benlevi	4 – 3 tied	HTC Center (1,502); Conway, SC
January 20, 2018; 2:15 pm, ESPN3		Georgia Southern; Modern Day Hate	W 83–66	14–6 (5–2)	24 – Simonds	10 – Simonds	6 – Simonds	GSU Sports Arena (3,854); Atlanta, GA
January 25, 2018; 7:15 pm, ESPN3		UT Arlington	W 81–75	15–6 (6–2)	29 – Simonds	13 – Session	5 – Simonds	GSU Sports Arena (1,567); Atlanta, GA
January 27, 2018; 2:15 pm, ESPN3		Texas State	W 54–50	16–6 (7–2)	20 – Simonds	11 – Session	3 – 3 tied	GSU Sports Arena (1,236); Atlanta, GA
February 1, 2018; 8:30 pm, ESPN3		at Arkansas State	W 77–66	17–6 (8–2)	21 – Simonds	10 – Benlevi	6 – Simonds	First National Bank Arena (2,792); Jonesboro, AR
February 3, 2018; 6:00 pm		at Little Rock	W 81–51	18–6 (9–2)	38 – Mitchell	9 – Session	8 – Simonds	Jack Stephens Center (2,373); Little Rock, AR
February 8, 2018; 7:15 pm, ESPN3		Louisiana	W 106–92	19–6 (10–2)	22 – Tied	12 – Benlevi	8 – Simonds	GSU Sports Arena (2,065); Atlanta, GA
February 10, 2018; 2:15 pm, ESPN3		Louisiana–Monroe	L 82–90 ^{OT}	19–7 (10–3)	39 – Simonds	12 – Simonds	5 – Simonds	GSU Sports Arena (1,807); Atlanta, GA
February 17, 2018; 9:00 pm, ESPN2		at Georgia Southern; Modern Day Hate	L 80–85	19–8 (10–4)	21 – Simonds	12 – Benlevi	3 – Tied	Hanner Fieldhouse (3,897); Statesboro, GA
February 22, 2018; 8:30 pm		at Texas State	W 77–50	20–8 (11–4)	19 – Simonds	7 – Benlevi	5 – Mitchell	Strahan Coliseum (2,054); San Marcos, TX
February 24, 2018; 5:15 pm, ESPN3		at UT Arlington	L 81–89	20–9 (11–5)	25 – Mitchell	7 – Thomas	5 – Simonds	College Park Center (2,803); Arlington, TX
March 1, 2018; 7:15 pm, ESPN3		Troy	L 70–83	20–10 (11–6)	27 – Simonds	8 – Tied	2 – 3 tied	GSU Sports Arena (1,793); Atlanta, GA
March 3, 2018; 2:15 pm, ESPN3		South Alabama	W 90–75	21–10 (12–6)	23 – I. Williams	8 – K. Williams	4 – K. Williams	GSU Sports Arena (1,649); Atlanta, GA
Sun Belt tournament
March 9, 2018; 6:00 pm, ESPN3	(2)	vs. (7) Troy; Quarterfinals	W 73–51	22–10	19 – Thomas	8 – Tied	7 – Simonds	Lakefront Arena; New Orleans, LA
March 10, 2018; 3:00 pm, ESPN3	(2)	vs. (3) Georgia Southern; Semifinals	W 73–67	23–10	16 – Session	9 – Session	4 – K. Williams	Lakefront Arena; New Orleans, LA
March 11, 2018; 2:00 pm, ESPN2	(2)	vs. (4) UT Arlington; Championship	W 74–61	24–10	27 – Simonds	7 – Session	4 – Simonds	Lakefront Arena; New Orleans, LA
NCAA tournament
March 16, 2018*; 2:00 pm, TBS	(15 S)	vs. (2 S) No. 6 Cincinnati; First Round	L 53–68	24–11	24 – Simonds	6 – Benlevi	1 – 3 tied	Bridgestone Arena (17,552); Nashville, TN
*Non-conference game. ^{#}Rankings from AP Poll. (#) Tournament seedings in parentheses. S=South. All times are in Eastern Time.
