= 2017–18 South Alabama Jaguars men's basketball team =

American college basketball season

2017–18 South Alabama Jaguars men's basketball

Hall of Fame Tip Off Springfield champions
- Conference: Sun Belt Conference
- Record: 14–18 (7–11 Sun Belt)
- Head coach: Matthew Graves (5th season)
- Assistant coaches: Darnell Archey; Russ Willemsen; Brock Morris
- Home arena: Mitchell Center

2017–18 Sun Belt Conference men's basketball standings
	Conf.				Overall
Team	W		L	PCT	W		L	PCT
Louisiana	16	–	2	.889	27	–	7	.794
Georgia State †	12	–	6	.667	24	–	11	.686
Georgia Southern	11	–	7	.611	21	–	12	.636
Texas–Arlington	10	–	8	.556	21	–	13	.618
Louisiana–Monroe	9	–	9	.500	16	–	16	.500
Troy	9	–	9	.500	16	–	17	.485
Appalachian State	9	–	9	.500	15	–	18	.455
Coastal Carolina	8	–	10	.444	14	–	18	.438
South Alabama	7	–	11	.389	14	–	18	.438
Texas State	7	–	11	.389	15	–	18	.455
Arkansas State	6	–	12	.333	11	–	21	.344
Little Rock	4	–	14	.222	7	–	25	.219
† 2018 Sun Belt Conference tournament winner

The 2017–18 South Alabama Jaguars men's basketball team represented the University of South Alabama during the 2017–18 NCAA Division I men's basketball season. The Jaguars were led by fifth-year head coach Matthew Graves and played their home games at the Mitchell Center in Mobile, Alabama as members in the Sun Belt Conference. They finished the season 14–18, 7–11 in Sun Belt play to finish in a tie for ninth place. They lost in the first round of the Sun Belt tournament to Troy.

On March 8, South Alabama fired head coach Matthew Graves. He finished at South Alabama with a five-year record of 65–96.

On March 15, South Alabama hired Nicholls State head coach Richie Riley as their new head coach.

== Previous season ==
The Jaguars finished the 2016–17 season 14–18, 7–11 in Sun Belt play to finish in ninth place. They lost to Coastal Carolina in the first round of the Sun Belt tournament.

== Off-season ==
=== Departures ===
Name	Pos.	Height	Weight	Year	Hometown	Notes
Georgi Boyanov	F	6'7"	205	Senior	Bulgaria	Graduated.
Ken Williams	G	6'3"	198	Senior	Houston, TX	Graduated.
Nick Stover	F	6'6"	198	Senior	Los Angeles, CA	Graduated.
Dan MuepoKelly	F	6'7"	236	Senior	Fontana, CA	Graduated.
Nikola Marijan	F	7'1"	242	Sophomore	Serbia	Transferred to Tampa.

=== Incoming transfers ===
Name	Number	Pos.	Height	Weight	Year	Hometown	Previous School
Rodrick Sikes	14	G	6'1"	170	Junior	Ocean Springs, MS	Junior college transferred from Southwest Mississippi CC.
R.J. Kelly		F	6'7"	195	Sophomore	Powder Springs, GA	Transferred from Savannah State. Under NCAA transfer rules, Kelly will have to sit out for the 2017–18 season. Will have three years of remaining eligibility.
Rozelle Nix	34	F	6'11"	300	Senior	Cincinnati, OH	Graduate transfer from Pittsburgh. Under NCAA transfer rules, Nix will play immediately in the 2017–18 season. Will have one year of remaining eligibility.

=== Incoming recruits ===
College recruiting information
Name	Hometown	School	Height	Weight	Commit date
Joe Thompson; F	Kenner, Louisiana	Alfred Bonnabel High School	6 ft 8 in (2.03 m)	210 lb (95 kg)	
Joe Thompson; F	Recruit ratings: Scout: Rivals: 247Sports: ESPN: (NR)				
A.J. Caldwell; G	Sarasota, Florida	Riverview High School	6 ft 5 in (1.96 m)	180 lb (82 kg)	
A.J. Caldwell; G	Recruit ratings: Scout: Rivals: 247Sports: ESPN: (75)				
Overall recruit ranking:
Note: In many cases, Scout, Rivals, 247Sports, On3, and ESPN may conflict in their listings of height and weight.; In these cases, the average was taken. ESPN grades are on a 100-point scale.; Sources: "2017 Team Ranking". Rivals.

== Roster ==
2017–18 South Alabama Jaguars men's basketball team
Players
Coaches

Pos.	#	Name	Height	Weight	Year	Previous school	Hometown
F		R.J. Kelly (redshirt)	6 ft 5 in (1.96 m)	183 lb (83 kg)	RS So	Savannah State	Powder Springs, GA
F	0	Joe Thompson	6 ft 7 in (2.01 m)	211 lb (96 kg)	Fr	Bonnabel HS	Kenner, LA
G	1	Herb McGee	6 ft 1 in (1.85 m)	195 lb (88 kg)	So	Riverside Academy	Reserve, LA
F	3	Kevin Morris	6 ft 8 in (2.03 m)	265 lb (120 kg)	So	Dothan HS	Dothan, AL
G	4	A.J. Caldwell	6 ft 4 in (1.93 m)	190 lb (86 kg)	Fr	Riverview HS	Sarasota, FL
G	5	Dederick Lee	6 ft 0 in (1.83 m)	162 lb (73 kg)	Sr	Indian Hills CC	Clarksville, AR
G	11	John Pettway	6 ft 1 in (1.85 m)	180 lb (82 kg)	RS Fr	Keith HS	Safford, AL
G	13	Devin Epps	5 ft 11 in (1.8 m)	167 lb (76 kg)	RS Sr	Oakland HS	Murfreesboro, TN
G	14	Rodrick Sikes	6 ft 1 in (1.85 m)	155 lb (70 kg)	Jr	St. Martin HS	Ocean Springs, MS
G	21	Nick Davis	6 ft 6 in (1.98 m)	191 lb (87 kg)	Sr	Alabama State	Mount Vernon, AL
G	25	Jordan Andrews	6 ft 4 in (1.93 m)	180 lb (82 kg)	RS So	Youngstown State	Abita Springs, LA
G	30	Ethan Haslam	6 ft 1 in (1.85 m)	182 lb (83 kg)	RS So	Academy at the Lakes	Lithia, FL
F	33	Josh Ajayi	6 ft 7 in (2.01 m)	244 lb (111 kg)	RS So	San Gabriel Academy	El Monte, CA
F	34	Rozelle Nix	6 ft 11 in (2.11 m)	300 lb (136 kg)	GS	Pittsburgh	Cincinnati, OH
F	42	Trhae Mitchell	6 ft 6 in (1.98 m)	189 lb (86 kg)	RS So	Pebblebrook HS	Austell, GA

Head coach

- Matthew Graves (Butler)

Assistant coach(es)

- Darnell Archey (Butler)
- Russ Willemsen (Lee)
- Brock Morris (Snead State CC)

Legend

- (C) Team captain
- (S) Suspended
- (I) Ineligible
- (W) Walk-on
- Injured
- Current redshirt

Roster

== Schedule and results ==
Date time, TV	Rank^{#}	Opponent^{#}	Result	Record	Site (attendance) city, state
Exhibition
Oct 24, 2017*; 7:30 pm		at Spring Hill	W 77–55		Arthur Outlaw Recreational Center; Mobile, AL
Nov 3, 2017*; 7:35 pm		North Alabama	L 80–82		Mitchell Center (2,146); Mobile, AL
Regular season
Nov 10, 2017*; 8:00 pm, FCS		at Texas Tech; Hall of Fame Tip Off	L 50–75	0–1	United Supermarkets Arena (8,865); Lubbock, TX
Nov 13, 2017*; 7:05 pm		Mobile	W 71–49	1–1	Mitchell Center (1,990); Mobile, AL
Nov 16, 2017*; 6:00 pm		at La Salle; Hall of Fame Tip Off Classic	L 73–81	1–2	Tom Gola Arena (1,488); Philadelphia, PA
Nov 18, 2017*; 4:00 pm, ESPN3		vs. Maine; Hall of Fame Tip Off Springfield Bracket	W 68–46	2–2	Mohegan Sun Arena; Uncasville, CT
Nov 19, 2017*; 7:00 pm, ESPN3		vs. Saint Peter’s; Hall of Fame Tip Off Springfield Bracket	W 54–49	3–2	Mohegan Sun Arena; Uncasville, CT
Nov 22, 2017*; 7:05 pm		Stetson	L 77–81 ^{OT}	3–3	Mitchell Center (1,737); Mobile, AL
Nov 26, 2017*; 3:05 pm		New Orleans	W 55–52	4–3	Mitchell Center (1,548); Mobile, AL
Nov 29, 2017*; 7:05 pm		Southern Miss	W 69–58	5–3	Mitchell Center (2,353); Mobile, AL
Dec 2, 2017*; 6:00 pm		at FIU	L 58–87	5–4	FIU Arena (653); Miami, FL
Dec 10, 2017*; 2:00 pm, FSMW		at SIU Edwardsville	L 75–76	5–5	Vadalabene Center (1,155); Edwardsville, IL
Dec 16, 2017*; 3:05 pm		Eastern Illinois	W 63–52	6–5	Mitchell Center (1,901); Mobile, AL
Dec 21, 2017*; 12:00 pm		at Tulane	L 73–77	6–6	Devlin Fieldhouse (1,187); New Orleans, LA
Dec 29, 2017; 7:05 pm		Georgia State	W 86–64	7–6 (1–0)	Mitchell Center (1,788); Mobile, AL
Dec 31, 2017; 3:05 pm		at Georgia Southern	W 69–67	8–6 (2–0)	Mitchell Center (1,612); Mobile, AL
Jan 4, 2018; 7:30 pm		at Texas State	L 69–72	8–7 (2–1)	Strahan Coliseum (1,407); San Marcos, TX
Jan 6, 2018; 4:15 pm		at Texas–Arlington	L 67–91	8–8 (2–2)	College Park Center (1,914); Arlington, TX
Jan 9, 2018*; 7:05 pm		Trinity Baptist	W 99–34	9–8	Mitchell Center (1,924); Mobile, AL
Jan 13, 2018; 3:05 pm		Troy	L 64–79	9–9 (2–3)	Mitchell Center (3,014); Mobile, AL
Jan 18, 2018; 7:05 pm		Coastal Carolina	W 60–57	10–9 (3–3)	Mitchell Center (2,098); Mobile, AL
Jan 20, 2018; 3:05 pm		Appalachian State	W 83–77	11–9 (4–3)	Mitchell Center (3,877); Mobile, AL
Jan 25, 2018; 7:15 pm		at Louisiana	L 57–76	11–10 (4–4)	Cajundome (5,036); Lafayette, LA
Jan 27, 2018; 2:00 pm		at Louisiana–Monroe	L 74–83	11–11 (4–5)	Fant–Ewing Coliseum (1,635); Monroe, LA
Feb 3, 2018; 4:15 pm, ESPN3		at Troy	L 63–80	11–12 (4–6)	Trojan Arena (3,266); Troy, AL
Feb 8, 2018; 7:05 pm		Little Rock	W 73–56	12–12 (5–6)	Mitchell Center (1,541); Mobile, AL
Feb 10, 2018; 3:05 pm		Arkansas State	W 87–67	13–12 (6–6)	Mitchell Center (1,983); Mobile, AL
Feb 15, 2018; 6:30 pm, ESPN3		at Appalachian State	W 77–66	14–12 (7–6)	Holmes Center (w); Boone, NC
Feb 17, 2018; 2:30 pm		at Coastal Carolina	L 70–72	14–13 (7–7)	HTC Center (1,311); Conway, SC
Feb 22, 2018; 7:05 pm		Louisiana–Monroe	L 62–66	14–14 (7–8)	Mitchell Center (2,011); Mobile, AL
Feb 24, 2018; 7:05 pm		Louisiana	L 71–88	14–15 (7–9)	Mitchell Center (1,946); Mobile, AL
Mar 1, 2018; 6:30 pm		at Georgia Southern	L 74–81	14–16 (7–10)	Hanner Fieldhouse (1,526); Statesboro, GA
Mar 3, 2018; 1:15 pm, ESPN3		at Georgia State	L 75–90	14–17 (7–11)	GSU Sports Arena (1,649); Atlanta, GA
Sun Belt tournament
Mar 7, 2018; 5:00 pm, ESPN3	(10)	vs. (7) Troy; First round	L 62–69	14–18	Lakefront Arena (986); New Orleans, LA
*Non-conference game. ^{#}Rankings from AP Poll. (#) Tournament seedings in parentheses. All times are in Central Time.

== See also ==
- 2017–18 South Alabama Jaguars women's basketball team
