= 2017–18 Appalachian State Mountaineers men's basketball team =

American college basketball season

2017–18 Appalachian State Mountaineers men's basketball
- Conference: Sun Belt Conference
- Record: 15–18 (9–9 Sun Belt)
- Head coach: Jim Fox (4th season)
- Assistant coaches: Jason Allison; Bryan Lentz; Mantoris Robinson
- Home arena: George M. Holmes Convocation Center

2017–18 Sun Belt Conference men's basketball standings
	Conf.				Overall
Team	W		L	PCT	W		L	PCT
Louisiana	16	–	2	.889	27	–	7	.794
Georgia State †	12	–	6	.667	24	–	11	.686
Georgia Southern	11	–	7	.611	21	–	12	.636
Texas–Arlington	10	–	8	.556	21	–	13	.618
Louisiana–Monroe	9	–	9	.500	16	–	16	.500
Troy	9	–	9	.500	16	–	17	.485
Appalachian State	9	–	9	.500	15	–	18	.455
Coastal Carolina	8	–	10	.444	14	–	18	.438
South Alabama	7	–	11	.389	14	–	18	.438
Texas State	7	–	11	.389	15	–	18	.455
Arkansas State	6	–	12	.333	11	–	21	.344
Little Rock	4	–	14	.222	7	–	25	.219
† 2018 Sun Belt Conference tournament winner

The 2017–18 Appalachian State Mountaineers men's basketball team represented Appalachian State University during the 2017–18 NCAA Division I men's basketball season. The Mountaineers, led by fourth-year head coach Jim Fox, played their home games at the George M. Holmes Convocation Center in Boone, North Carolina as members of the Sun Belt Conference. They finished the season 15–18, 9–9 in Sun Belt play to finish in a three-way tie for fifth place. They defeated Little Rock in the first round of the Sun Belt tournament before losing in the quarterfinals to Texas–Arlington.

== Previous season ==
The Mountaineers finished the 2016–17 season 9–21, 4–14 in Sun Belt play to finish in 11th place. They lost in the first round of the Sun Belt tournament to Troy.

== Roster ==
2017–18 Appalachian State Mountaineers men's basketball team
Players
Coaches

Pos.	#	Name	Height	Weight	Year	Hometown
F	0	Isaac Johnson	6 ft 9 in (2.06 m)	212 lb (96 kg)	So	Charlotte, North Carolina
G	1	Justin Forrest	6 ft 2 in (1.88 m)	195 lb (88 kg)	Fr	Decatur, Georgia
G	2	Ronshad Shabazz	6 ft 5 in (1.96 m)	217 lb (98 kg)	Jr	Raleigh, North Carolina
G	3	Nick Hough	6 ft 4 in (1.93 m)	205 lb (93 kg)	RS Jr	Harrisburg, North Carolina
G	4	O'Showen Williams	5 ft 11 in (1.8 m)	190 lb (86 kg)	RS So	Macon, Georgia
F	5	Griffin Kinney	6 ft 8 in (2.03 m)	240 lb (109 kg)	Sr	Delaware, Ohio
G	10	Michael Bibby	6 ft 3 in (1.91 m)	175 lb (79 kg)	So	Phoenix, Arizona
G	11	Joseph Battle	6 ft 3 in (1.91 m)	181 lb (82 kg)	So	Abbeville, South Carolina
G	13	Kevin Kerley	6 ft 0 in (1.83 m)	178 lb (81 kg)	Jr	Loveland, Ohio
F	14	Bennett Holley	6 ft 8 in (2.03 m)	238 lb (108 kg)	Jr	Roanoke, Virginia
C	15	Jake Wilson	7 ft 1 in (2.16 m)	240 lb (109 kg)	RS Jr	Raleigh, North Carolina
G	23	Trey Ford	6 ft 0 in (1.83 m)	180 lb (82 kg)	Jr	Mooresville, North Carolina
F	24	Craig Hinton	6 ft 7 in (2.01 m)	203 lb (92 kg)	RS Sr	Winston-Salem, North Carolina
F	32	Tyrell Johnson	6 ft 8 in (2.03 m)	205 lb (93 kg)	Jr	Atlanta, Georgia
F	34	Zach Cottrell	6 ft 5 in (1.96 m)	205 lb (93 kg)	So	Hayesville, North Carolina
F	50	Hunter Seacaat	6 ft 9 in (2.06 m)	235 lb (107 kg)	RS So	Mooresville, North Carolina

Head coach

- Jim Fox (SUNY Geneseo)

Assistant coach(es)

- Jason Allison (Liberty)
- Bryan Lentz (Lenoir–Rhyne)
- Mantoris Robinson (Winthrop)

Legend

- (C) Team captain
- (S) Suspended
- (I) Ineligible
- (W) Walk-on
- Injured
- Current redshirt

Roster
Last update: November 10, 2017

== Schedule and results ==
Date time, TV	Rank^{#}	Opponent^{#}	Result	Record	Site (attendance) city, state
Exhibition
Nov 7, 2017*; 7:00 pm		Warren Wilson	W 126–71		Holmes Center (815); Boone, NC
Non-conference regular season
Nov 11, 2017*; 3:30 pm, ESPN3		Toccoa Falls	W 135–34	1–0	Holmes Center (872); Boone, NC
Nov 12, 2017*; 3:30 pm, ESPN3		Bridgewater; Puerto Rico Tip-Off	W 95–57	2–0	Holmes Center (550); Boone, NC
Nov 16, 2017*; 5:30 pm, ESPNU		vs. Iowa State; Puerto Rico Tip-Off quarterfinals	L 98–104	2–1	HTC Center (703); Conway, SC
Nov 17, 2017*; 5:00 pm, ESPNU		vs. Western Michigan; Puerto Rico Tip-Off	L 67–86	2–2	HTC Center (1,827); Conway, SC
Nov 19, 2017*; 11:30 am, ESPN3		vs. UTEP; Puerto Rico Tip-Off	W 76–72	3–2	HTC Center (1,774); Conway, SC
Nov 22, 2017*; 4:00 pm		at James Madison	L 99–105 ^{2OT}	3–3	JMU Convocation Center (2,062); Harrisonburg, VA
Nov 25, 2017*; 7:00 pm		Davidson	W 78–62	4–3	Holmes Center (1,216); Boone, NC
Nov 28, 2017*; 7:00 pm, MASN		at VCU	L 72–85	4–4	Siegel Center (7,637); Richmond, VA
Dec 2, 2017*; 7:00 pm		South Florida	W 84–61	5–4	Holmes Center (1,506); Boone, NC
Dec 4, 2017*; 7:00 pm, ESPN3		at Western Carolina	L 71–72	5–5	Ramsey Center (3,303); Cullowhee, NC
Dec 9, 2017*; 2:00 pm, ESPN3		at Akron	L 89–94	5–6	James A. Rhodes Arena (2,219); Akron, OH
Dec 16, 2017*; 6:00 pm, BTN		at Ohio State	L 67–80	5–7	Value City Arena (12,616); Columbus, OH
Dec 20, 2017*; 7:00 pm		at Hampton	L 53–86	5–8	Hampton Convocation Center (2,145); Hampton, VA
Sun Belt Conference regular season
Dec 29, 2017; 7:30 pm		Texas State	W 66–62	6–8 (1–0)	Holmes Center (1,058); Boone, NC
Dec 31, 2017; 2:30 pm		Texas–Arlington	W 80–76	7–8 (2–0)	Holmes Center (891); Boone, NC
Jan 4, 2018; 8:15 pm		at Louisiana	L 45–78	7–9 (2–1)	Cajundome (4,329); Lafayette, LA
Jan 6, 2018; 3:00 pm		at Louisiana–Monroe	W 79–73	8–9 (3–1)	Fant–Ewing Coliseum (1,423); Monroe, LA
Jan 11, 2018; 7:30 pm		Georgia State	L 58–71	8–10 (3–2)	Holmes Center (701); Boone, NC
Jan 13, 2018; 3:30 pm		Georgia Southern	L 59–60	8–11 (3–3)	Holmes Center (1,669); Boone, NC
Jan 20, 2018; 4:00 pm		at South Alabama	L 77–83	8–12 (3–4)	Mitchell Center (3,877); Mobile, AL
Jan 22, 2018; 8:15 pm, ESPN3		at Troy	L 79–81	8–13 (3–5)	Trojan Arena (79–81); Troy, AL
Jan 25, 2018; 7:30 pm, ESPN3		Little Rock	W 72–67 ^{OT}	9–13 (4–5)	Holmes Center (1,053); Boone, NC
Jan 27, 2018; 3:30 pm, ESPN3		Arkansas State	L 88–93	9–14 (4–6)	Holmes Center (1,805); Boone, NC
Feb 1, 2018; 8:15 pm, ESPN3		at Texas–Arlington	L 77–89	9–15 (4–7)	College Park Center (2,330); Arlington, TX
Feb 3, 2018; 5:30 pm		at Texas State	W 59–56	10–15 (5–7)	Strahan Coliseum (1,744); San Marcos, TX
Feb 10, 2018; 3:30 pm		at Coastal Carolina	W 81–66	11–15 (6–7)	HTC Center (2,100); Conway, SC
Feb 15, 2018; 7:30 pm, ESPN3		South Alabama	L 66–77	11–16 (6–8)	Holmes Center (2,100); Boone, NC
Feb 17, 2018; 3:30 pm, ESPN3		Troy	W 65–54	12–16 (7–8)	Holmes Center (2,407); Boone, NC
Feb 22, 2018; 8:30 pm, ESPN3		at Arkansas State	L 79–82 ^{OT}	12–17 (7–9)	First National Bank Arena (2,671); Jonesboro, AR
Feb 24, 2018; 3:30 pm		at Little Rock	W 69–67	13–17 (8–9)	Jack Stephens Center (2,472); Little Rock, AR
Mar 3, 2018; 3:30 pm, ESPN3		Coastal Carolina	W 76–67	14–17 (9–9)	Holmes Center (1,437); Boone, NC
Sun Belt tournament
Mar 7, 2018; 3:00 pm, ESPN3	(5)	vs. (12) Little Rock; First round	W 93–64	15–17	Lakefront Arena; New Orleans, LA
Mar 9, 2018; 3:00 pm, ESPN3	(5)	vs. (4) Texas–Arlington; Quarterfinals	L 63–84	15–18	Lakefront Arena; New Orleans, LA
*Non-conference game. ^{#}Rankings from AP Poll. (#) Tournament seedings in parentheses. All times are in Eastern Time.
