= 2017–18 Texas State Bobcats men's basketball team =

American college basketball season

2017–18 Texas State Bobcats men's basketball
- Conference: Sun Belt Conference
- Record: 15–18 (7–11 Sun Belt)
- Head coach: Danny Kaspar (5th season)
- Assistant coaches: Jim Shaw; Robert Guster; Terrence Johnson
- Home arena: Strahan Coliseum

2017–18 Sun Belt Conference men's basketball standings
	Conf.				Overall
Team	W		L	PCT	W		L	PCT
Louisiana	16	–	2	.889	27	–	7	.794
Georgia State †	12	–	6	.667	24	–	11	.686
Georgia Southern	11	–	7	.611	21	–	12	.636
Texas–Arlington	10	–	8	.556	21	–	13	.618
Louisiana–Monroe	9	–	9	.500	16	–	16	.500
Troy	9	–	9	.500	16	–	17	.485
Appalachian State	9	–	9	.500	15	–	18	.455
Coastal Carolina	8	–	10	.444	14	–	18	.438
South Alabama	7	–	11	.389	14	–	18	.438
Texas State	7	–	11	.389	15	–	18	.455
Arkansas State	6	–	12	.333	11	–	21	.344
Little Rock	4	–	14	.222	7	–	25	.219
† 2018 Sun Belt Conference tournament winner

The 2017–18 Texas State Bobcats men's basketball team represented Texas State University in the 2017–18 NCAA Division I men's basketball season. The Bobcats, led by fifth-year head coach Danny Kaspar, played their home games at Strahan Coliseum in San Marcos, Texas as members of the Sun Belt Conference. They finished the season 15–18, 7–11 in Sun Belt play to finish in a tie for ninth place. As the No. 9 seed in the Sun Belt tournament, they defeated Coastal Carolina before losing to Louisiana in the quarterfinals.

== Previous season ==
The Bobcats finished the 2016–17 season 22–14, 11–7 in Sun Belt play to finish in a three-way tie for third place. At the Sun Belt tournament they defeated Louisiana–Monroe and UT Arlington before losing in the championship game to Troy. They received an invitation to the CollegeInsider.com Tournament where they defeated Lamar and Idaho before losing in the quarterfinals to Saint Peter's.

== Roster ==
2017–18 Texas State Bobcats men's basketball team
Players
Coaches

Pos.	#	Name	Height	Weight	Year	Hometown
G	0	Isaiah Gurley	6 ft 3 in (1.91 m)	195 lb (88 kg)	Jr	Brooklyn, New York
G	1	Reggie Miller	6 ft 0 in (1.83 m)	150 lb (68 kg)	Fr	Houston, Texas
G	2	Tre'Larenz Nottingham	6 ft 2 in (1.88 m)	185 lb (84 kg)	Jr	Moreno Valley, California
G	3	Deris Duncan	6 ft 4 in (1.93 m)	185 lb (84 kg)	Sr	Fishers, Indiana
G	4	Shelby Adams	6 ft 3 in (1.91 m)	175 lb (79 kg)	So	Converse, Texas
G	5	Marlin Davis	6 ft 2 in (1.88 m)	165 lb (75 kg)	So	Houston, Texas
G	10	Tyler Blount	5 ft 11 in (1.8 m)	165 lb (75 kg)	Sr	Virginia Beach, Virginia
F	14	Quentin Scott	6 ft 7 in (2.01 m)	215 lb (98 kg)	Fr	Houma, Louisiana
G	22	Nijal Pearson	6 ft 5 in (1.96 m)	200 lb (91 kg)	So	Beaumont, Texas
F	23	Alex Peacock	6 ft 7 in (2.01 m)	215 lb (98 kg)	Jr	Bloomington, Illinois
F	25	Alonzo Sule	6 ft 8 in (2.03 m)	230 lb (104 kg)	Fr	Houston, Texas
F	33	Immanuel King	6 ft 8 in (2.03 m)	230 lb (104 kg)	Sr	Rocky Mount, North Carolina
G	35	Jaylen Shead	6 ft 1 in (1.85 m)	170 lb (77 kg)	Jr	Pflugerville, Texas
F	45	Eric Terry	6 ft 8 in (2.03 m)	230 lb (104 kg)	RS So	Houston, Texas
F	55	Nedeljko Prijovic	6 ft 8 in (2.03 m)	210 lb (95 kg)	So	Belgrade, Serbia

Head coach

- Danny Kaspar (North Texas State)

Assistant coach(es)

- Jim Shaw (Grinnell)
- Terrence Johnson
- Robert Guster (Missouri–Rolla)

Legend

- (C) Team captain
- (S) Suspended
- (I) Ineligible
- (W) Walk-on
- Injured
- Current redshirt

Roster

== Schedule and results ==
Date time, TV	Rank^{#}	Opponent^{#}	Result	Record	Site (attendance) city, state
Exhibition
Nov 2, 2017*; 7:00 pm		St. Edward's	W 76–64		Strahan Coliseum; San Marcos, TX
Nov 4, 2017*; 7:00 pm		Rogers State	W 77–48		Strahan Coliseum (1,361); San Marcos, TX
Non-conference regular season
Nov 12, 2017*; 3:00 pm, ESPN3		at Air Force; Men Against Breast Cancer Showcase	L 57–65	0–1	Clune Arena (1,511); Colorado Springs, CO
Nov 15, 2017*; 7:00 pm, ESPN3		UTSA	L 78–79	0–2	Strahan Coliseum (3,224); San Marcos, TX
Nov 18, 2017*; 4:30 pm		Texas–Rio Grande Valley	W 75–58	1–2	Strahan Coliseum (75–58); San Marcos, TX
Nov 22, 2017*; 9:00 pm		vs. Arkansas–Pine Bluff; Men Against Breast Cancer Showcase	W 71–54	2–2	Alex G. Spanos Center (30); Stockton, CA
Nov 24, 2017*; 10:30 pm		vs. Canisius; Men Against Breast Cancer Showcase	L 62–68	2–3	Alex G. Spanos Center (1,349); Stockton, CA
Nov 25, 2017*; 8:00 pm		at Pacific; Men Against Breast Cancer Showcase	W 85–78	3–3	Alex G. Spanos Center (1,325); Stockton, CA
Nov 29, 2017*; 7:00 pm		Texas A&M–Corpus Christi	W 66–53	4–3	Strahan Coliseum (1,548); San Marcos, TX
Dec 2, 2017*; 7:00 pm		at Houston Baptist	L 52–71	4–4	Sharp Gymnasium (963); Houston, TX
Dec 6, 2017*; 7:00 pm		McMurry	W 100–50	5–4	Strahan Coliseum (1,403); San Marcos, TX
Dec 9, 2017*; 4:00 pm		at Abilene Christian	L 68–72	5–5	Moody Coliseum (1,356); Abilene, TX
Dec 17, 2017*; 4:00 pm		at Colorado State	L 58–66	5–6	Moby Arena (2,737); Fort Collins, CO
Dec 19, 2017*; 7:00 pm		Ecclesia	W 85–43	6–6	Strahan Coliseum (1,088); San Marcos, TX
Dec 22, 2017*; 4:00 pm		at Rice	W 74–66	7–6	Tudor Fieldhouse (2,913); Houston, TX
Sun Belt regular season
Dec 29, 2017; 6:30 pm		at Appalachian State	L 62–66	7–7 (0–1)	Holmes Center (1,058); Boone, NC
Dec 31, 2017; 2:30 pm		at Coastal Carolina	W 53–48	8–7 (1–1)	HTC Center (1,021); Conway, SC
Jan 4, 2018; 7:30 pm		South Alabama	W 72–69	9–7 (2–1)	Strahan Coliseum (1,407); San Marcos, TX
Jan 6, 2018; 4:30 pm, ESPN3		Troy	W 57–56	10–7 (3–1)	Strahan Coliseum (1,560); San Marcos, TX
Jan 11, 2018; 7:30 pm		at Arkansas State	W 73–67	11–7 (4–1)	First National Bank Arena (1,275); Jonesboro, AR
Jan 13, 2018; 7:30 pm		at Little Rock	W 72–70	12–7 (5–1)	Jack Stephens Center (2,165); Little Rock, AR
Jan 18, 2018; 7:30 pm, ESPN3		Louisiana–Monroe	W 55–52	13–7 (6–1)	Strahan Coliseum (2,233); San Marcos, TX
Jan 20, 2018; 7:00 pm, ESPN3		Louisiana	L 55–80	13–8 (6–2)	Strahan Coliseum (3,222); San Marcos, TX
Jan 25, 2018; 6:30 pm, ESPN3		at Georgia Southern	W 62–61	14–8 (7–2)	Hanner Fieldhouse (1,437); Statesboro, GA
Jan 27, 2018; 1:15 pm, ESPN3		at Georgia State	L 50–54	14–9 (7–3)	GSU Sports Arena (1,236); Atlanta, GA
Feb 1, 2018; 7:30 pm		Coastal Carolina	L 54–56 ^{OT}	14–10 (7–4)	Strahan Coliseum (2,278); San Marcos, TX
Feb 3, 2018; 4:30 pm		Appalachian State	L 56–59	14–11 (7–5)	Strahan Coliseum (1,744); San Marcos, TX
Feb 10, 2018; 1:15 pm, ESPN3		at Texas–Arlington	L 68–70 ^{OT}	14–12 (7–6)	College Park Center (2,602); Arlington, TX
Feb 15, 2018; 7:15 pm		at Louisiana	L 63–73	14–13 (7–7)	Cajundome (4,382); Lafayette, LA
Feb 17, 2018; 2:00 pm		at Louisiana–Monroe	L 71–79	14–14 (7–8)	Fant–Ewing Coliseum (1,810); Monroe, LA
Feb 22, 2018; 7:30 pm		Georgia State	L 50–77	14–15 (7–9)	Strahan Coliseum (2,054); San Marcos, TX
Feb 24, 2018; 4:30 pm, ESPN3		Georgia Southern	L 77–81	14–16 (7–10)	Strahan Coliseum (1,934); San Marcos, TX
Mar 2, 2018; 6:00 pm, ESPN2		Texas–Arlington	L 82–85	14–17 (7–11)	Strahan Coliseum (3,356); San Marcos, TX
Sun Belt tournament
Mar 7, 2018; 11:30 am, ESPN3	(9)	vs. (8) Coastal Carolina; First round	W 73–66	15–17	Lakefront Arena; New Orleans, LA
Mar 9, 2018; 11:30 am, ESPN3	(9)	vs. (1) Louisiana; Quarterfinals	L 54–80	15–18	Lakefront Arena; New Orleans, LA
*Non-conference game. ^{#}Rankings from AP Poll. (#) Tournament seedings in parentheses. All times are in Central Time.
