= 2017–18 Troy Trojans men's basketball team =

American college basketball season

2017–18 Troy Trojans men's basketball
- Conference: Sun Belt Conference
- Record: 16–17 (9–9 Sun Belt)
- Head coach: Phil Cunningham (5th season)
- Assistant coaches: Marcus Grant; Ben Fletcher; Adam Howard
- Home arena: Trojan Arena (Capacity 5,200)

2017–18 Sun Belt Conference men's basketball standings
	Conf.				Overall
Team	W		L	PCT	W		L	PCT
Louisiana	16	–	2	.889	27	–	7	.794
Georgia State †	12	–	6	.667	24	–	11	.686
Georgia Southern	11	–	7	.611	21	–	12	.636
Texas–Arlington	10	–	8	.556	21	–	13	.618
Louisiana–Monroe	9	–	9	.500	16	–	16	.500
Troy	9	–	9	.500	16	–	17	.485
Appalachian State	9	–	9	.500	15	–	18	.455
Coastal Carolina	8	–	10	.444	14	–	18	.438
South Alabama	7	–	11	.389	14	–	18	.438
Texas State	7	–	11	.389	15	–	18	.455
Arkansas State	6	–	12	.333	11	–	21	.344
Little Rock	4	–	14	.222	7	–	25	.219
† 2018 Sun Belt Conference tournament winner

The 2017–18 Troy Trojans men's basketball team represented Troy University during the 2017–18 NCAA Division I men's basketball season. The Trojans, led by fifth-year head coach Phil Cunningham, played their home games at Trojan Arena in Troy, Alabama as members of the Sun Belt Conference. They finished the season 16–17, 9–9 in Sun Belt play to finish in a three-way tie for fifth place. They defeated South Alabama in the first round of the Sun Belt tournament before losing in the quarterfinals to Georgia State.

== Previous season ==
The Trojans finished the 2016–17 season 22–15, 20–8 in Sun Belt play to finish in a three-way tie for sixth place. They defeated Appalachian State, Georgia Southern, Georgia State and Texas State to win the Sun Belt tournament. As a result, the Trojans received the conference's automatic bid to the NCAA tournament as a No. 15 seed. They lost in the first round to Duke

== Off-season ==
=== Departures ===
Name	Pos.	Height	Weight	Year	Hometown	Notes
Daniel Peace	G	6'1"	182	Senior	Decatur, GA	Graduated.
Jeremy Hollimon	G	6'3"	195	Senior	Gulfport, MS	Graduated.
Devon Walker	F	6'6"	203	Senior	Winter Haven, FL	Graduated.

=== Incoming recruits ===
College recruiting information
Name	Hometown	School	Height	Weight	Commit date
Javan Johnson; PG	Decatur, Alabama	Austin High School	6 ft 6 in (1.98 m)	175 lb (79 kg)	
Javan Johnson; PG	Recruit ratings: Scout: Rivals: (NR)				
De'Lazarus Keys; PF	Orlando, Florida	Central Florida Christian Academy	6 ft 8 in (2.03 m)	240 lb (110 kg)	
De'Lazarus Keys; PF	Recruit ratings: Scout: Rivals: (NR)				
Malik Burnett; PG	Huntsville, Alabama	Lee High School	6 ft 3 in (1.91 m)	180 lb (82 kg)	
Malik Burnett; PG	Recruit ratings: Scout: Rivals: (NR)				
Overall recruit ranking:
Note: In many cases, Scout, Rivals, 247Sports, On3, and ESPN may conflict in their listings of height and weight.; In these cases, the average was taken. ESPN grades are on a 100-point scale.; Sources: "2017 Team Ranking". Rivals.

== Roster ==
2017–18 Troy Trojans men's basketball team
Players
Coaches

Pos.	#	Name	Height	Weight	Year	Hometown
G	0	Kevin Baker	6 ft 2 in (1.88 m)	180 lb (82 kg)	Sr	St. Louis, Missouri
G	3	Wesley Person	6 ft 3 in (1.91 m)	190 lb (86 kg)	Sr	Brantley, Alabama
F	4	Juan Davis, Jr.	6 ft 8 in (2.03 m)	225 lb (102 kg)	Sr	West Point, Mississippi
G	11	B.J. Miller	6 ft 0 in (1.83 m)	185 lb (84 kg)	Jr	Meridian, Mississippi
G	13	Darian Adams	6 ft 3 in (1.91 m)	210 lb (95 kg)	RS Fr	Montgomery, Alabama
F/C	14	Jaro Moravek	6 ft 8 in (2.03 m)	240 lb (109 kg)	Sr	Handlová, Slovakia
F	22	Whit Moreman	6 ft 8 in (2.03 m)	205 lb (93 kg)	So	LaGrange, Georgia
F	23	Jordon Varnado	6 ft 6 in (1.98 m)	215 lb (98 kg)	Jr	Brownsville, Tennessee
G/F	24	Shawn Hopkins	6 ft 5 in (1.96 m)	195 lb (88 kg)	Jr	Nokia, Finland
F	30	Alex Hicks	6 ft 8 in (2.03 m)	215 lb (98 kg)	Jr	Seale, Alabama
G/F	15	Atakan Sahinkaya	6 ft 5 in (1.96 m)	199 lb (90 kg)	Fr	Istanbul, Turkey
G	5	Malik Burnett	6 ft 2 in (1.88 m)	180 lb (82 kg)	Fr	Huntsville, Alabama
F	1	Javan Johnson	6 ft 7 in (2.01 m)	190 lb (86 kg)	Fr	Decatur, Alabama

Head coach

- Phil Cunningham (Campbellsville)

Assistant coach(es)

- Marcus Grant (Mississippi State)
- Ben Fletcher (Troy)
- Adam Howard (Western Kentucky)

Legend

- (C) Team captain
- (S) Suspended
- (I) Ineligible
- (W) Walk-on
- Injured
- Current redshirt

Roster

== Schedule and results ==
Date time, TV	Rank^{#}	Opponent^{#}	Result	Record	Site (attendance) city, state
Exhibition
Nov. 1, 2017*; 7:15 pm		Georgia Southwestern State	L 87–88		Trojan Arena; Troy, AL
Nov. 5, 2017*; 2:00 pm		at Mercer; Hurricane Relief exhibition	L 73–77		Hawkins Arena; Macon, GA
Non-conference regular season
Nov. 10, 2017*; 9:30 pm		vs. North Dakota; Rainbow Classic	L 80–83	0–1	Stan Sheriff Center (5,764); Honolulu, HI
Nov. 12, 2017*; 7:30 pm		vs. Arkansas–Pine Bluff; Rainbow Classic	W 81–57	1–1	Stan Sheriff Center (5,180); Honolulu, HI
Nov. 13, 2017*; 12:00 am		at Hawaii; Rainbow Classic	L 67–72 ^{OT}	1–2	Stan Sheriff Center (5,078); Honolulu, HI
Nov. 16, 2017*; 7:00 pm		Brewton–Parker	W 106–71	2–2	Trojan Arena (1,363); Troy, AL
Nov. 20, 2017*; 7:00 pm, SECN		at No. 8 Kentucky; Adolph Rupp Classic	L 62–70	2–3	Rupp Arena (19,548); Lexington, KY
Nov. 22, 2017*; 6:00 pm		at East Tennessee State; Adolph Rupp Classic	W 73–65	3–3	Freedom Hall Civic Center; Johnson City, TN
Nov. 27, 2017*; 7:00 pm, ESPN3		Delaware State; Adolph Rupp Classic	W 95–64	4–3	Trojan Arena (1,201); Troy, AL
Nov. 29, 2017*; 7:00 pm, ESPN3		UIC; Adolph Rupp Classic	W 87–66	5–3	Trojan Arena (1,093); Troy, AL
Dec. 5, 2017*; 7:00 pm		UAB	L 78–90	5–4	Trojan Arena (3,213); Troy, AL
Dec. 10, 2017*; 2:00 pm, ESPN3		at Southern Miss	L 71–89	5–5	Reed Green Coliseum (1,937); Hattiesburg, MS
Dec. 16, 2017*; 7:00 pm		vs. Arkansas; North Little Rock Showcase	L 63–88	5–6	Verizon Arena (16,416); North Little Rock, AR
Dec. 19, 2017*; 7:00 pm		at Austin Peay	L 73–75	5–7	Dunn Center (1,519); Clarksville, TN
Dec. 21, 2017*; 6:00 pm		Milligan	W 80–67	6–7	Dothan Civic Center (856); Dothan, AL
Sun Belt Conference regular season
Dec. 29, 2017; 7:15 pm, ESPN3		Georgia Southern	L 80–86	6–8 (0–1)	Trojan Arena (2,361); Troy, AL
Dec. 31, 2017; 3:15 pm, ESPN3		Georgia State	W 68–66	7–8 (1–1)	Trojan Arena (1,835); Troy, AL
Jan. 4, 2018; 7:15 pm		at Texas–Arlington	L 76–86	7–9 (1–2)	College Park Center (1,868); Arlington, TX
Jan. 6, 2018; 4:30 pm, ESPN3		at Texas State	L 56–57	7–10 (1–3)	Strahan Coliseum (1,560); San Marcos, TX
Jan. 13, 2018; 3:05 pm		at South Alabama	W 79–64	8–10 (2–3)	Mitchell Center (3,014); Mobile, AL
Jan. 20, 2018; 4:15 pm, ESPN3		Coastal Carolina	L 73–74	8–11 (2–4)	Trojan Arena (2,891); Troy, AL
Jan. 22, 2018; 7:15 pm, ESPN3		Appalachian State	W 81–79	9–11 (3–4)	Trojan Arena (3,017); Troy, AL
Jan. 25, 2018; 7:00 pm		at Louisiana–Monroe	L 71–76	9–12 (3–5)	Fant–Ewing Coliseum (1,651); Monroe, LA
Jan. 27, 2018; 2:00 pm		at Louisiana	L 69–81	9–13 (3–6)	Cajundome (4,865); Lafayette, LA
Feb. 3, 2018; 4:15 pm, ESPN3		South Alabama	W 80–63	10–13 (4–6)	Trojan Arena (3,266); Troy, AL
Feb. 8, 2018; 7:15 pm, ESPN3		Arkansas State	W 89–83 ^{OT}	11–13 (5–6)	Troy Arena (1,851); Troy, AL
Feb. 10, 2018; 4:15 pm, ESPN3		Little Rock	W 82–64	12–13 (6–6)	Trojan Arena (1,721); Troy, AL
Feb. 15, 2018; 7:30 pm		at Coastal Carolina	W 66–65	13–13 (7–6)	HTC Center (1,518); Conway, SC
Feb. 17, 2018; 3:30 pm, ESPN3		at Appalachian State	L 54–65	13–14 (7–7)	Holmes Center (2,407); Boone, NC
Feb. 22, 2018; 7:15 pm, ESPN3		Louisiana	L 76–81	13–15 (7–8)	Trojan Arena (2,236); Troy, AL
Feb. 24, 2018; 4:15 pm, ESPN3		Louisiana–Monroe	W 73–67	14–15 (8–8)	Trojan Arena (2,317); Troy, AL
Mar. 1, 2018; 7:15 pm, ESPN3		at Georgia State	W 83–70	15–15 (9–8)	GSU Sports Arena (1,793); Atlanta, GA
Mar. 3, 2018; 5:00 pm, ESPN3		at Georgia Southern	L 83–89	15–16 (9–9)	Hanner Fieldhouse (2,264); Statesboro, GA
Sun Belt tournament
Mar 7, 2018; 5:00 pm, ESPN3	(7)	vs. (10) South Alabama; First round	W 69–62	16–16	Lakefront Arena (986); New Orleans, LA
Mar 9, 2018; 5:00 pm, ESPN3	(7)	vs. (2) Georgia State; Quarterfinals	L 51–73	16–17	Lakefront Arena; New Orleans, LA
*Non-conference game. ^{#}Rankings from AP Poll. (#) Tournament seedings in parentheses. All times are in Central Time.
