= 2017–18 Georgia Southern Eagles men's basketball team =

American college basketball season

2017–18 Georgia Southern Eagles men's basketball
- Conference: Sun Belt Conference
- Record: 21–12 (11–7 Sun Belt)
- Head coach: Mark Byington (5th season)
- Assistant coaches: Andrew Wilson; Larry Dixon; Ben Betts
- Home arena: Hanner Fieldhouse

2017–18 Sun Belt Conference men's basketball standings
	Conf.				Overall
Team	W		L	PCT	W		L	PCT
Louisiana	16	–	2	.889	27	–	7	.794
Georgia State †	12	–	6	.667	24	–	11	.686
Georgia Southern	11	–	7	.611	21	–	12	.636
Texas–Arlington	10	–	8	.556	21	–	13	.618
Louisiana–Monroe	9	–	9	.500	16	–	16	.500
Troy	9	–	9	.500	16	–	17	.485
Appalachian State	9	–	9	.500	15	–	18	.455
Coastal Carolina	8	–	10	.444	14	–	18	.438
South Alabama	7	–	11	.389	14	–	18	.438
Texas State	7	–	11	.389	15	–	18	.455
Arkansas State	6	–	12	.333	11	–	21	.344
Little Rock	4	–	14	.222	7	–	25	.219
† 2018 Sun Belt Conference tournament winner

The 2017–18 Georgia Southern Eagles men's basketball team represented Georgia Southern University during the 2017–18 NCAA Division I men's basketball season. The Eagles, led by fifth-year head coach Mark Byington, played their home games at Hanner Fieldhouse in Statesboro, Georgia as members of the Sun Belt Conference. They finished the season 21–12, 11–7 in Sun Belt play to finish in third place. They defeated Louisiana–Monroe in the quarterfinals of the Sun Belt tournament before losing in the semifinals to Georgia State. Despite having 21 wins, they did not participate in a postseason tournament.

== Previous season ==
The Eagles finished the 2016–17 season 18–18, 11–7 in Sun Belt play to finish in a three-way tie for third place. They lost in the quarterfinals of the Sun Belt tournament to Troy. They were invited to the College Basketball Invitational where they lost in the first round to Utah Valley.

== Roster ==
2017–18 Georgia Southern Eagles men's basketball team
Players
Coaches

Pos.	#	Name	Height	Weight	Year	Hometown
F	0	Montae Glenn	6 ft 8 in (2.03 m)	230 lb (104 kg)	Jr	Carrollton, Georgia
G	1	Jared Hamilton	6 ft 4 in (1.93 m)	190 lb (86 kg)	RS So	Charlotte, North Carolina
G	2	Mike Hughes	6 ft 3 in (1.91 m)	190 lb (86 kg)	Sr	Winston-Salem, North Carolina
G	3	Ike Smith	6 ft 4 in (1.93 m)	210 lb (95 kg)	Jr	Gainesville, Florida
G	4	Tookie Brown	5 ft 11 in (1.8 m)	180 lb (82 kg)	Jr	Madison, Georgia
F	5	B. J. Gladden	6 ft 6 in (1.98 m)	210 lb (95 kg)	Sr	Charlotte, North Carolina
G	10	Jake Allsmiller	6 ft 5 in (1.96 m)	185 lb (84 kg)	Sr	Nashville, Tennessee
F	11	Shawn O'Connell	6 ft 8 in (2.03 m)	210 lb (95 kg)	RS Jr	Roswell, Georgia
G	13	Quan Jackson	6 ft 4 in (1.93 m)	180 lb (82 kg)	RS Fr	Tallahassee, Florida
F	14	Coye Simmons	6 ft 8 in (2.03 m)	240 lb (109 kg)	Sr	Winston-Salem, North Carolina
G	21	Tione Jones	5 ft 8 in (1.73 m)	165 lb (75 kg)	Sr	Gwinnett, Georgia
F	23	Simeon Carter	6 ft 8 in (2.03 m)	215 lb (98 kg)	Jr	Charlotte, North Carolina
G	24	David-Lee Jones, Jr.	6 ft 0 in (1.83 m)	160 lb (73 kg)	So	Tampa, Florida
F	25	David Georgiev	6 ft 7 in (2.01 m)	200 lb (91 kg)	So	Skopje, Macedonia
G	30	DeDe Reynolds	5 ft 11 in (1.8 m)	165 lb (75 kg)	Jr	Madison, Georgia
C	35	Tyshaun Crawford	7 ft 1 in (2.16 m)	270 lb (122 kg)	Fr	Griffin, Georgia

Head coach

- Mark Byington (UNC Wilmington)

Assistant coach(es)

- Andrew Wilson (Florida State)
- Larry Dixon (Johnson C. Smith)
- Ben Betts (Roanoke)

Legend

- (C) Team captain
- (S) Suspended
- (I) Ineligible
- (W) Walk-on
- Injured
- Current redshirt

Roster
Last update: November 14, 2017

== Schedule and results ==
Date time, TV	Rank^{#}	Opponent^{#}	Result	Record	Site (attendance) city, state
Exhibition
Nov 1, 2017*; 7:00 pm		Georgia College	W 92–59		Hanner Fieldhouse (1,242); Statesboro, GA
Nov 3, 2017*; 7:00 pm		Augusta	W 88–67		Hanner Fieldhouse (2,015); Statesboro, GA
Non-conference regular season
Nov 10, 2017*; 7:30 pm, ACCN Extra		at Wake Forest	W 85–83	1–0	LJVM Coliseum (7,802); Winston-Salem, NC
Nov 13, 2017*; 7:30 pm		Cal State Bakersfield	W 77–53	2–0	Hanner Fieldhouse (2,423); Statesboro, GA
Nov 16, 2017*; 7:00 pm		Bluefield State; Gulf Coast Showcase	W 120–52	3–0	Hanner Fieldhouse (1,567); Statesboro, GA
Nov 20, 2017*; 1:30 pm		vs. Missouri State; Gulf Coast Showcase quarterfinals	W 74–73	4–0	Germain Arena; Estero, FL
Nov 21, 2017*; 5:00 pm		vs. UMKC; Gulf Coast Showcase semifinals	W 78–75	5–0	Germain Arena; Estero, FL
Nov 22, 2017*; 7:30 pm		vs. Towson; Gulf Coast Showcase championship game	L 67–70	5–1	Germain Arena; Estero, FL
Nov 25, 2017*; 2:00 pm, ESPN3		at Bradley	L 57–62	5–2	Carver Arena (4,670); Peoria, IL
Dec 2, 2017*; 5:00 pm		Tennessee Wesleyan	W 97–61	6–2	Hanner Fieldhouse (811); Statesboro, GA
Dec 9, 2017*; 5:00 pm		Savannah State	W 102–91	7–2	Hanner Fieldhouse (1,105); Statesboro, GA
Dec 12, 2017*; 7:00 pm		at George Mason	W 74–51	8–2	EagleBank Arena (2,607); Fairfax, VA
Dec 16, 2017*; 5:00 pm, ESPN3		at Cal State Bakersfield	L 53–55	8–3	Icardo Center (2,588); Bakersfield, CA
Dec 19, 2017*; 7:00 pm, ESPN3		at Kennesaw State	W 78–69	9–3	KSU Convocation Center (1,356); Kennesaw, GA
Dec 22, 2017*; 7:00 pm, ESPN3		at East Tennessee State	L 59–79	9–4	Freedom Hall Civic Center (4,050); Johnson City, TN
Sun Belt Conference regular season
Dec 29, 2017; 8:15 pm, ESPN3		at Troy	W 86–80	10–4 (1–0)	Hanner Fieldhouse (2,361); Statesboro, GA
Dec 31, 2017; 4:00 pm		at South Alabama	L 67–69	10–5 (1–1)	Mitchell Center (1,612); Mobile, AL
Jan 4, 2018; 7:30 pm		Arkansas State	W 80–49	11–5 (2–1)	Hanner Fieldhouse (1,122); Statesboro, GA
Jan 6, 2018; 5:00 pm, ESPN3		Little Rock	W 72–69	12–5 (3–1)	Hanner Fieldhouse (1,392); Statesboro, GA
Jan 11, 2018; 7:30 pm		at Coastal Carolina	W 77–66	13–5 (4–1)	HTC Center (1,329); Conway, SC
Jan 13, 2018; 3:30 pm		at Appalachian State	W 60–59	14–5 (5–1)	Holmes Center (1,669); Boone, NC
Jan 20, 2018; 2:15 pm, ESPN3		at Georgia State	L 66–83	14–6 (5–2)	GSU Sports Arena (3,854); Atlanta, GA
Jan 25, 2018; 7:30 pm, ESPN3		Texas State	L 61–62	14–7 (5–3)	Hanner Fieldhouse (1,437); Statesboro, GA
Jan 27, 2018; 5:00 pm, ESPN3		UT Arlington	W 74–59	15–7 (6–3)	Hanner Fieldhouse (2,511); Statesboro, GA
Feb 1, 2018; 8:00 pm		at Little Rock	W 67–61	16–7 (7–3)	Jack Stephens Center (2,084); Little Rock, AR
Feb 3, 2018; 8:00 pm, ESPN3		at Arkansas State	L 89–91	16–8 (7–4)	First National Bank Arena (2,276); Jonesboro, AR
Feb 8, 2018; 7:30 pm, ESPN3		Louisiana–Monroe	L 64–66 ^{OT}	16–9 (7–5)	Hanner Fieldhouse (1,510); Statesboro, GA
Feb 10, 2018; 5:00 pm, ESPN3		Louisiana	L 91–102	16–10 (7–6)	Hanner Fieldhouse (2,687); Statesboro, GA
Feb 16, 2018; 9:00 pm, ESPN2		Georgia State	W 85–80	17–10 (8–6)	Hanner Fieldhouse (3,897); Statesboro, GA
Feb 22, 2018; 8:00 pm, ESPN3		at UT Arlington	L 63–84	17–11 (8–7)	College Park Center (2,099); Arlington, TX
Feb 24, 2018; 5:30 pm, ESPN3		at Texas State	W 81–77	18–11 (9–7)	Strahan Coliseum (1,934); San Marcos, TX
Mar 1, 2018; 7:30 pm, ESPN3		South Alabama	W 81–74	19–11 (10–7)	Hanner Fieldhouse (1,526); Statesboro, GA
Mar 3, 2018; 5:00 pm, ESPN3		Troy	W 89–83	20–11 (11–7)	Hanner Fieldhouse (2,264); Statesboro, GA
Sun Belt tournament
Mar 9, 2018; 8:30 pm, ESPN3	(3)	vs. (6) Louisiana–Monroe; Quarterfinals	W 63–55	21–11	Lakefront Arena; New Orleans, LA
Mar 10, 2018; 2:00 pm, ESPN3	(3)	vs. (2) Georgia State; Semifinals	L 67–73	21–12	Lakefront Arena; New Orleans, LA
*Non-conference game. ^{#}Rankings from AP Poll. (#) Tournament seedings in parentheses. All times are in Eastern Time.
