= 2017–18 Little Rock Trojans men's basketball team =

American college basketball season

2017–18 Little Rock Trojans men's basketball
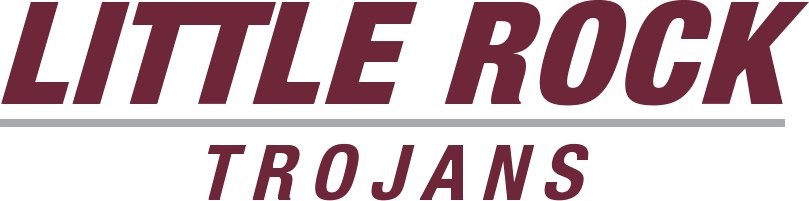
- Conference: Sun Belt Conference
- Record: 7–25 (4–14 Sun Belt)
- Head coach: Wes Flanigan (2nd season)
- Assistant coaches: Kwanza Johnson; Mitch Cole; Solomon Bozeman
- Home arena: Jack Stephens Center

2017–18 Sun Belt Conference men's basketball standings
	Conf.				Overall
Team	W		L	PCT	W		L	PCT
Louisiana	16	–	2	.889	27	–	7	.794
Georgia State †	12	–	6	.667	24	–	11	.686
Georgia Southern	11	–	7	.611	21	–	12	.636
Texas–Arlington	10	–	8	.556	21	–	13	.618
Louisiana–Monroe	9	–	9	.500	16	–	16	.500
Troy	9	–	9	.500	16	–	17	.485
Appalachian State	9	–	9	.500	15	–	18	.455
Coastal Carolina	8	–	10	.444	14	–	18	.438
South Alabama	7	–	11	.389	14	–	18	.438
Texas State	7	–	11	.389	15	–	18	.455
Arkansas State	6	–	12	.333	11	–	21	.344
Little Rock	4	–	14	.222	7	–	25	.219
† 2018 Sun Belt Conference tournament winner

The 2017–18 Little Rock Trojans men's basketball team represented the University of Arkansas at Little Rock during the 2017–18 NCAA Division I men's basketball season. The Trojans, led by second-year head coach Wes Flanigan, played their home games at the Jack Stephens Center in Little Rock, Arkansas as members of the Sun Belt Conference. They finished the season 7–25, 4–14 in Sun Belt play to finish in last place. They lost in the first round of the Sun Belt tournament to Appalachian State.

On March 9, 2018, the school fired head coach Wes Flanigan after just two seasons where he compiled a record of 22–42. On March 29, the school hired former NBA player Darrell Walker who had spent the last two seasons as head coach of Division II Clark Atlanta University.

== Previous season ==
The Trojans finished the 2016–17 season 15–17, 6–12 in Sun Belt play to finish in tenth place. They lost in the first round of the Sun Belt tournament to Louisiana–Lafayette.

== Roster ==
2017–18 Little Rock Trojans men's basketball team
Players
Coaches

Pos.	#	Name	Height	Weight	Year	Hometown
F	0	Ryan Pippins	6 ft 0 in (1.83 m)	250 lb (113 kg)	So	Little Rock, Arkansas
G	1	Andre Jones	6 ft 4 in (1.93 m)	198 lb (90 kg)	So	Little Rock, Arkansas
G	2	Deondre Burns	6 ft 2 in (1.88 m)	185 lb (84 kg)	Jr	Yazoo City, Mississippi
G	3	Cameron Corcoran	6 ft 1 in (1.85 m)	170 lb (77 kg)	Fr	Orlando, Florida
F	5	Oliver Black	6 ft 9 in (2.06 m)	226 lb (103 kg)	RS Jr	Jackson, Mississippi
G	10	Jaizec Lottie	6 ft 1 in (1.85 m)	170 lb (77 kg)	Fr	Aurora, Colorado
G	11	Camron Reedus	6 ft 3 in (1.91 m)	186 lb (84 kg)	Jr	Decatur, Alabama
F	13	Cézanne Carson	6 ft 6 in (1.98 m)	200 lb (91 kg)	Jr	Birmingham, Alabama
F	14	Damir Hadzic	6 ft 8 in (2.03 m)	227 lb (103 kg)	Fr	Sarajevo, Bosnia and Herzegovina
G/F	15	Khari Harley	6 ft 9 in (2.06 m)	185 lb (84 kg)	RS Sr	Egg Harbor Township, New Jersey
G/F	20	K.J. Gilmore	6 ft 5 in (1.96 m)	205 lb (93 kg)	RS Jr	Atlanta, Georgia
F	23	Wadley Mompremier	6 ft 11 in (2.11 m)	228 lb (103 kg)	RS Sr	Miami, Florida
G/F	24	Ben Marcus	6 ft 5 in (1.96 m)	216 lb (98 kg)	RS Jr	Pine Bluff, Arkansas
G	25	Brandon Brady	5 ft 9 in (1.75 m)	170 lb (77 kg)	RS Sr	Little Rock, Arkansas
G	30	Anthony Black	5 ft 7 in (1.7 m)	150 lb (68 kg)	Jr	Little Rock, Arkansas
F	32	Kris Bankston	6 ft 8 in (2.03 m)	194 lb (88 kg)	Fr	Dewitt, Arkansas
G	55	Rayjon Tucker	6 ft 5 in (1.96 m)	210 lb (95 kg)	Jr	Charlotte, North Carolina

Head coach

- Wes Flanigan (Auburn)

Assistant coach(es)

- Kwanza Johnson (Tulsa)
- Mitch Cole (MT ST–Billings)
- Solomon Bozeman (Little Rock)

Legend

- (C) Team captain
- (S) Suspended
- (I) Ineligible
- (W) Walk-on
- Injured
- Current redshirt

Roster
Last update: November 15, 2017

== Schedule and results ==
Date time, TV	Rank^{#}	Opponent^{#}	Result	Record	Site (attendance) city, state
Exhibition
Nov 3, 2017*; 6:30 pm		Southwest Baptist	W 84–68		Jack Stephens Center; Little Rock, AR
Non-conference regular season
Nov 11, 2017*; 3:00 pm		Ouachita Baptist	L 79–81	0–1	Jack Stephens Center; Little Rock, AR
Nov 14, 2017*; 7:00 pm, ESPN3		at Memphis	L 62–70	0–2	FedExForum (7,224); Memphis, TN
Nov 18, 2017*; 8:00 pm, ESPN3		at Grand Canyon; Grand Canyon Classic	L 51–76	0–3	GCU Arena (7,394); Phoenix, AZ
Nov 20, 2017*; 9:00 pm		at San Diego; Grand Canyon Classic	L 52–66	0–4	Jenny Craig Pavilion (1,074); San Diego, CA
Nov 25, 2017*; 3:00 pm		Robert Morris; Grand Canyon Classic	L 64–78	0–5	Jack Stephens Center (1,403); Little Rock, AR
Nov 26, 2017*; 3:00 pm		Norfolk State; Grand Canyon Classic	W 70–55	1–5	Jack Stephens Center (1,068); Little Rock, AR
Nov 29, 2017*; 6:30 pm		Central Arkansas	W 71–65	2–5	Jack Stephens Center (3,189); Little Rock, AR
Dec 2, 2017*; 3:00 pm		Oral Roberts	L 66–74 ^{2OT}	2–6	Jack Stephens Center (2,111); Little Rock, AR
Dec 9, 2017*; 7:00 pm		at Central Arkansas	L 54–69	2–7	Farris Center (2,412); Conway, AR
Dec 13, 2017*; 7:00 pm, ESPN3		at Bradley	L 46–86	2–8	Carver Arena (4,670); Peoria, IL
Dec 15, 2017*; 6:30 pm		at Sam Houston State	L 55–57	2–9	Bernard Johnson Coliseum (636); Huntsville, TX
Dec 18, 2017*; 6:30 pm		University of the Ozarks	W 94–49	3–9	Jack Stephens Center (1,533); Little Rock, AR
Dec 20, 2017*; 7:00 pm, SECN+		at Mississippi State	L 48–64	3–10	Humphrey Coliseum (7,156); Starkville, MS
Sun Belt Conference regular season
Dec 29, 2017; 7:00 pm		Louisiana	L 63–77	3–11 (0–1)	Jack Stephens Center (1,688); Little Rock, AR
Dec 31, 2017; 4:00 pm		Louisiana–Monroe	W 71–62	4–11 (1–1)	Jack Stephens Center (1,632); Little Rock, AR
Jan 4, 2018; 6:15 pm, ESPN3		at Georgia State	L 64–73	4–12 (1–2)	GSU Sports Arena (970); Atlanta, GA
Jan 6, 2018; 4:00 pm, ESPN3		at Georgia Southern	L 69–72	4–13 (1–3)	Hanner Fieldhouse (1,392); Statesboro, GA
Jan 11, 2018; 7:00 pm		Texas–Arlington	W 77–65	5–13 (2–3)	Jack Stephens Center (2,091); Little Rock, AR
Jan 13, 2018; 5:00 pm		Texas State	L 70–72	5–14 (2–4)	Jack Stephens Center (2,165); Little Rock, AR
Jan 20, 2018; 5:00 pm		Arkansas State	L 62–70	5–15 (2–5)	Jack Stephens Center (5,113); Little Rock, AR
Jan 25, 2018; 6:30 pm, ESPN3		at Appalachian State	L 67–72 ^{OT}	5–16 (2–6)	Holmes Center (1,053); Boone, NC
Jan 27, 2018; 2:30 pm		at Coastal Carolina	L 62–72	5–17 (2–7)	HTC Center (1,267); Conway, SC
Feb 1, 2018; 7:00 pm		Georgia Southern	L 61–67	5–18 (2–8)	Jack Stephens Center (2,084); Little Rock, AR
Feb 3, 2018; 5:00 pm		Georgia State	L 51–81	5–19 (2–9)	Jack Stephens Center (2,373); Little Rock, AR
Feb 8, 2018; 7:00 pm		at South Alabama	L 56–73	5–20 (2–10)	Mitchell Center (1,541); Mobile, AL
Feb 10, 2018; 4:15 pm, ESPN3		at Troy	L 64–82	5–21 (2–11)	Trojan Arena (1,721); Troy, AL
Feb 17, 2018; 7:00 pm, ESPN3		at Arkansas State	W 82–78	6–21 (3–11)	First National Bank Arena (2,671); Jonesboro, AR
Feb 22, 2018; 7:00 pm		Coastal Carolina	L 60–65	6–22 (3–12)	Jack Stephens Center (1,488); Little Rock, AR
Feb 24, 2018; 5:00 pm		Appalachian State	L 67–69	6–23 (3–13)	Jack Stephens Center (2,472); Little Rock, AR
Mar 1, 2018; 7:00 pm		at Louisiana–Monroe	L 44–48	6–24 (3–14)	Fant–Ewing Coliseum (1,537); Monroe, LA
Mar 3, 2018; 7:00 pm		at Louisiana	W 72–61 ^{OT}	7–24 (4–14)	Cajundome (5,275); Lafayette, LA
Sun Belt tournament
Mar 7, 2018; 2:00 pm, ESPN3	(12)	vs. (5) Appalachian State; First round	L 64–93	7–25	Lakefront Arena; New Orleans, LA
*Non-conference game. ^{#}Rankings from AP Poll. (#) Tournament seedings in parentheses. All times are in Central Time.
