= 2017–18 Arkansas State Red Wolves men's basketball team =

American college basketball season

2017–18 Arkansas State Red Wolves men's basketball
- Conference: Sun Belt Conference
- Record: 11–21 (6–12 Sun Belt)
- Head coach: Mike Balado (1st season)
- Assistant coaches: Vince Walden; Casey Stanley; Mike Scutero
- Home arena: First National Bank Arena

2017–18 Sun Belt Conference men's basketball standings
	Conf.				Overall
Team	W		L	PCT	W		L	PCT
Louisiana	16	–	2	.889	27	–	7	.794
Georgia State †	12	–	6	.667	24	–	11	.686
Georgia Southern	11	–	7	.611	21	–	12	.636
Texas–Arlington	10	–	8	.556	21	–	13	.618
Louisiana–Monroe	9	–	9	.500	16	–	16	.500
Troy	9	–	9	.500	16	–	17	.485
Appalachian State	9	–	9	.500	15	–	18	.455
Coastal Carolina	8	–	10	.444	14	–	18	.438
South Alabama	7	–	11	.389	14	–	18	.438
Texas State	7	–	11	.389	15	–	18	.455
Arkansas State	6	–	12	.333	11	–	21	.344
Little Rock	4	–	14	.222	7	–	25	.219
† 2018 Sun Belt Conference tournament winner

The 2017–18 Arkansas State Red Wolves men's basketball team represented Arkansas State University during the 2017–18 NCAA Division I men's basketball season. The Red Wolves, led by first-year head coach Mike Balado, played their home games at the First National Bank Arena in Jonesboro, Arkansas as members of the Sun Belt Conference. They finished the season 11–21, 6–12 in Sun Belt play to finish in 11th place. They lost in the first round of the Sun Belt tournament to Louisiana–Monroe.

== Previous season ==
The Red Wolves finished the 2016–17 season 20–12, 11–7 in Sun Belt play to finish in a three-way tie for third place. As the No. 5 seed in the Sun Belt tournament, they lost to Louisiana–Monroe in the first round. Despite having 20 wins, they did not participate in a postseason tournament.

On March 13, 2017, head coach Grant McCasland left the school to accept the head coaching position at North Texas. On March 20, the school named Louisville assistant Mike Balado as their new head coach.

== Roster ==
2017–18 Arkansas State Red Wolves men's basketball team
Players
Coaches

Pos.	#	Name	Height	Weight	Year	Hometown
G	0	Ty Cockfield	5 ft 11 in (1.8 m)	185 lb (84 kg)	Jr	Gainesville, Georgia
G	1	Rashad Lindsey	5 ft 11 in (1.8 m)	165 lb (75 kg)	Sr	St. Louis, Missouri
F	2	Salif Boudie	6 ft 8 in (2.03 m)	212 lb (96 kg)	So	Mali, West Africa
G	3	Marquis Eaton	6 ft 2 in (1.88 m)	196 lb (89 kg)	RS Fr	Helena, Arkansas
G	4	Tristin Walley	6 ft 7 in (2.01 m)	211 lb (96 kg)	RS Jr	Richton, Mississippi
G	5	C.J. Foster	6 ft 2 in (1.88 m)	188 lb (85 kg)	RS Sr	Lawrenceville, Georgia
G	10	Grantham Gillard	6 ft 4 in (1.93 m)	205 lb (93 kg)	Jr	Minneapolis, Minnesota
G	11	Christian Willis	6 ft 0 in (1.83 m)	193 lb (88 kg)	So	St. Louis, Missouri
F	12	Connor Kern	6 ft 8 in (2.03 m)	215 lb (98 kg)	Fr	Banner Elk, North Carolina
G	13	Morgan McKay	6 ft 4 in (1.93 m)	186 lb (84 kg)	RS So	Pickerington, Ohio
F	15	Jake Scoggins	6 ft 9 in (2.06 m)	211 lb (96 kg)	RS Fr	Benton, Arkansas
G	23	Deven Simms	6 ft 4 in (1.93 m)	204 lb (93 kg)	Sr	St. Louis, Missouri
F	25	Shaquillo Fritz	6 ft 8 in (2.03 m)	202 lb (92 kg)	Jr	Freeport, Bahamas
F	32	Tamas Bruce	6 ft 7 in (2.01 m)	193 lb (88 kg)	Sr	Osceola, Arkansas
G	33	Andrew Riley	5 ft 10 in (1.78 m)	183 lb (83 kg)	Sr	Jackson, Mississippi

Head coach

- Mike Balado (St. Thomas)

Assistant coach(es)

- Vince Walden (Longwood)
- Casey Stanely (Iona)
- Mike Scutero (Central Florida)

Legend

- (C) Team captain
- (S) Suspended
- (I) Ineligible
- (W) Walk-on
- Injured
- Current redshirt

Roster
Last update: November 10, 2017

== Schedule and results ==
Date time, TV	Rank^{#}	Opponent^{#}	Result	Record	Site (attendance) city, state
Non-conference regular season
Nov 10, 2017*; 7:00 pm, ESPN3		at Evansville	L 63–77	0–1	Ford Center (3,632); Evansville, IN
Nov 13, 2017*; 7:00 pm		Abilene Christian	W 83–69	1–1	First National Bank Arena (2,730); Jonesboro, AR
Nov 16, 2017*; 6:00 pm, ESPN3		at Eastern Michigan; Hoosier Tip-Off Classic	L 59–76	1–2	Convocation Center (741); Ypsilanti, MI
Nov 20, 2017*; 7:00 pm		Howard; Hoosier Tip-Off Classic	W 92–78	2–2	First National Bank Arena (2,478); Jonesboro, AR
Nov 22, 2017*; 6:00 pm, BTN		at Indiana; Hoosier Tip-Off Classic	L 70–87	2–3	Simon Skjodt Assembly Hall (12,646); Bloomington, IN
Nov 24, 2017*; 11:00 am, ESPN3		at South Florida; Hoosier Tip-Off Classic	L 61–72	2–4	USF Sun Dome (2,284); Tampa, FL
Nov 29, 2017*; 6:00 pm, ESPN3		at Cleveland State	L 72–75	2–5	Wolstein Center (1,175); Cleveland, OH
Dec 5, 2017*; 7:00 pm		UT Martin	L 78–96	2–6	First National Bank Arena (2,116); Jonesboro, AR
Dec 9, 2017*; 7:00 pm		Henderson State	W 90–76	3–6	First National Bank Arena (1,774); Jonesboro, AR
Dec 13, 2017*; 7:00 pm		at Omaha	L 74–77	3–7	Baxter Arena (2,250); Omaha, NE
Dec 16, 2017*; 6:00 pm		at Florida Atlantic	W 64–63	4–7	FAU Arena; Boca Raton, FL
Dec 19, 2017*; 7:00 pm, ESPN3		at No. 11 Wichita State	L 80–89	4–8	Charles Koch Arena (10,506); Wichita, KS
Dec 22, 2017*; 7:00 pm		Culver–Stockton	W 99–68	5–8	First National Bank Arena (833); Jonesboro, AR
Sun Belt Conference regular season
Dec 29, 2017; 7:30 pm		Louisiana–Monroe	W 75–64	6–8 (1–0)	First National Bank Arena (2,028); Jonesboro, AR
Dec 31, 2017; 3:30 pm		Louisiana	L 78–88	6–9 (1–1)	First National Bank Arena (2,076); Jonesboro, AR
Jan 4, 2018; 6:30 pm		at Georgia Southern	L 49–80	6–10 (1–2)	Hanner Fieldhouse (1,122); Statesboro, GA
Jan 6, 2018; 1:30 pm, ESPN3		at Georgia State	L 75–79	6–11 (1–3)	GSU Sports Arena (1,187); Atlanta, GA
Jan 11, 2018; 7:30 pm		Texas State	L 67–73	6–12 (1–4)	First National Bank Arena (1,275); Jonesboro, AR
Jan 13, 2018; 7:00 pm		Texas–Arlington	L 71–97	6–13 (1–5)	First National Bank Arena (2,461); Jonesboro, AR
Jan 20, 2018; 5:00 pm		at Little Rock	W 70–62	7–13 (2–5)	Jack Stephens Center (5,113); Little Rock, AR
Jan 25, 2018; 6:30 pm		at Coastal Carolina	L 47–62	7–14 (2–6)	HTC Center (1,322); Conway, SC
Jan 27, 2018; 2:30 pm, ESPN3		at Appalachian State	W 93–88	8–14 (3–6)	Holmes Center (1,805); Boone, NC
Feb 1, 2018; 7:30 pm, ESPN3		Georgia State	L 66–77	8–15 (3–7)	First National Bank Arena (2,792); Jonesboro, AR
Feb 3, 2018; 7:00 pm, ESPN3		Georgia Southern	W 91–89	9–15 (4–7)	First National Bank Arena (2,276); Jonesboro, AR
Feb 8, 2018; 7:15 pm, ESPN3		at Troy	L 83–89 ^{OT}	9–16 (4–8)	Trojan Arena (1,851); Troy, AL
Feb 10, 2018; 3:00 pm		at South Alabama	L 67–87	9–17 (4–9)	Mitchell Center (1,983); Mobile, AL
Feb 17, 2018; 7:00 pm, ESPN3		Little Rock	L 78–82	9–18 (4–10)	First National Bank Arena (2,671); Jonesboro, AR
Feb 22, 2018; 7:30 pm, ESPN3		Appalachian State	W 82–79 ^{OT}	10–18 (5–10)	First National Bank Arena (2,671); Jonesboro, AR
Feb 24, 2018; 7:00 pm, ESPN3		Coastal Carolina	L 81–88	10–19 (5–11)	First National Bank Arena (1,619); Jonesboro, AR
Mar 1, 2018; 7:15 pm		at Louisiana	L 74–85	10–20 (5–12)	Cajundome (4,307); Lafayette, LA
Mar 3, 2018; 2:00 pm		at Louisiana–Monroe	W 83–79	11–20 (6–12)	Fant–Ewing Coliseum (2,083); Monroe, LA
Sun Belt tournament
Mar 7, 2018; 7:30 pm, ESPN3	(11)	vs. (6) Louisiana–Monroe; First round	L 54–76	11–21	Lakefront Arena (986); New Orleans, LA
*Non-conference game. ^{#}Rankings from AP Poll. (#) Tournament seedings in parentheses. All times are in Central Time. Source.
