= 2017–18 Louisiana–Monroe Warhawks men's basketball team =

American college basketball season

2017–18 Louisiana–Monroe Warhawks men's basketball

CIT, First Round
- Conference: Sun Belt Conference
- Record: 16–16 (9–9 Sun Belt)
- Head coach: Keith Richard (8th season)
- Assistant coaches: Ryan Cross; Stephen Cowherd; Phillipe Lilavois
- Home arena: Fant–Ewing Coliseum

2017–18 Sun Belt Conference men's basketball standings
	Conf.				Overall
Team	W		L	PCT	W		L	PCT
Louisiana	16	–	2	.889	27	–	7	.794
Georgia State †	12	–	6	.667	24	–	11	.686
Georgia Southern	11	–	7	.611	21	–	12	.636
Texas–Arlington	10	–	8	.556	21	–	13	.618
Louisiana–Monroe	9	–	9	.500	16	–	16	.500
Troy	9	–	9	.500	16	–	17	.485
Appalachian State	9	–	9	.500	15	–	18	.455
Coastal Carolina	8	–	10	.444	14	–	18	.438
South Alabama	7	–	11	.389	14	–	18	.438
Texas State	7	–	11	.389	15	–	18	.455
Arkansas State	6	–	12	.333	11	–	21	.344
Little Rock	4	–	14	.222	7	–	25	.219
† 2018 Sun Belt Conference tournament winner

The 2017–18 Louisiana–Monroe Warhawks men's basketball team represented the University of Louisiana at Monroe in the 2017–18 NCAA Division I men's basketball season. The Warhawks, led by eighth-year head coach Keith Richard, played their home games at Fant–Ewing Coliseum as members of the Sun Belt Conference. They finished the season 16–16, 9–9 in Sun Belt play to finish in a tie for fifth place. They defeated Arkansas State in the first round of the Sun Belt tournament before losing in the quarterfinals to Georgia Southern. They received an invitation to the CollegeInsider.com Tournament where they lost in the first round to Austin Peay.

== Previous season ==
The Warhawks finished the 2016–17 season 9–24, 2–16 in Sun Belt play to finish in last place. In the Sun Belt tournament, they defeated Arkansas State before losing to Texas State in the quarterfinals.

== Roster ==
2017–18 Louisiana–Monroe Warhawks men's basketball team
Players
Coaches

Pos.	#	Name	Height	Weight	Year	Hometown
G	0	Brandon Newman	6 ft 4 in (1.93 m)	180 lb (82 kg)	Jr	Hawthorne, California
F	1	Travis Munnings	6 ft 6 in (1.98 m)	200 lb (91 kg)	Jr	Freeport, Bahamas
G	2	Michael Ertel	6 ft 2 in (1.88 m)	175 lb (79 kg)	Fr	Indianapolis, Indiana
G	3	Donovan Walker	6 ft 0 in (1.83 m)	175 lb (79 kg)	Jr	Silver Spring, Maryland
C	4	Sam Alabakis	6 ft 11 in (2.11 m)	245 lb (111 kg)	So	Perth, Australia
G	5	Marvin Jean-Pierre	6 ft 3 in (1.91 m)	190 lb (86 kg)	Sr	Pompano Beach, Florida
F	11	Kiir Deng	6 ft 9 in (2.06 m)	200 lb (91 kg)	RS Jr	Adelaide, Australia
F	15	Roderick Taylor	6 ft 8 in (2.03 m)	225 lb (102 kg)	RS Jr	Harker Heights, Texas
G	22	Lance Richard	5 ft 10 in (1.78 m)	180 lb (82 kg)	RS Sr	Monroe, Louisiana
G	23	Jordon Harris	5 ft 11 in (1.8 m)	170 lb (77 kg)	Sr	San Antonio, Texas
G	24	Calvin Anderson	6 ft 4 in (1.93 m)	190 lb (86 kg)	Jr	Freeport, Bahamas
G	25	Wade Martin	6 ft 6 in (1.98 m)	190 lb (86 kg)	Jr	Point Pleasant, West Virginia

Head coach

- Keith Richard (Northeast Louisiana)

Assistant coach(es)

- Ryan Cross (Buffalo)
- Stephen Cowherd (South Alabama)
- Phillipe Lilavois (Texas Tech)

Legend

- (C) Team captain
- (S) Suspended
- (I) Ineligible
- (W) Walk-on
- Injured
- Current redshirt

Roster
Last update: November 15, 2017

== Schedule and results ==
Date time, TV	Rank^{#}	Opponent^{#}	Result	Record	Site (attendance) city, state
Non-conference regular season
Nov 10, 2017*; 8:00 pm, FCS		at TCU	L 73–83	0–1	Schollmaier Arena (6,715); Fort Worth, TX
Nov 12, 2017*; 3:00 pm, ESPN3		at SMU	L 65–83	0–2	Moody Coliseum (6,622); Dallas, TX
Nov 16, 2017*; 8:00 pm		Southeastern Louisiana	W 86–75	1–2	Fant–Ewing Coliseum (1,602); Monroe, LA
Nov 21, 2017*; 7:00 pm		Northwestern State	L 61–76	1–3	Fant–Ewing Coliseum (1,927); Monroe, LA
Nov 26, 2017*; 2:00 pm		Rust	W 104–46	2–3	Fant–Ewing Coliseum (1,269); Monroe, LA
Nov 28, 2017*; 7:00 pm		Jackson State	W 65–62	3–3	Fant–Ewing Coliseum (1,284); Monroe, LA
Dec 2, 2017*; 3:30 pm, ESPN3		at Stephen F. Austin	L 65–68	3–4	William R. Johnson Coliseum (3,941); Nacogdoches, TX
Dec 9, 2017*; 1:00 pm		at Jacksonville State	L 56–75	3–5	Pete Mathews Coliseum (1,154); Jacksonville, AL
Dec 12, 2017*; 7:00 pm		Grambling State	W 59–57	4–5	Fant–Ewing Coliseum (1,391); Monroe, LA
Dec 18, 2017*; 7:00 pm		Millsaps	W 97–44	5–5	Fant–Ewing Coliseum (1,355); Monroe, LA
Dec 20, 2017*; 7:00 pm		Centenary	W 74–51	6–5	Fant–Ewing Coliseum (1,268); Monroe, LA
Sun Belt Conference regular season
Dec 29, 2017; 7:30 pm		at Arkansas State	L 64–75	6–6 (0–1)	First National Bank Arena (2,028); Jonesboro, AR
Dec 31, 2017; 4:00 pm		at Little Rock	L 62–71	6–7 (0–2)	Jack Stephens Center (1,632); Little Rock, AR
Jan 4, 2018; 7:00 pm		Coastal Carolina	W 82–72	7–7 (1–2)	Fant–Ewing Coliseum (1,318); Monroe, LA
Jan 6, 2018; 2:00 pm		Appalachian State	L 73–79	7–8 (1–3)	Fant–Ewing Coliseum (1,423); Monroe, LA
Jan 13, 2018; 7:00 pm		at Louisiana	L 48–82	7–9 (1–4)	Cajundome (5,813); Lafayette, LA
Jan 18, 2018; 7:30 pm, ESPN3		at Texas State	L 52–55	7–10 (1–5)	Strahan Coliseum (2,233); San Marcos, TX
Jan 20, 2018; 4:15 pm, ESPN3		at Texas–Arlington	L 55–71	7–11 (1–6)	College Park Center (2,138); Arlington, TX
Jan 25, 2018; 7:00 pm		Troy	W 76–71	8–11 (2–6)	Fant–Ewing Coliseum (1,651); Monroe, LA
Jan 27, 2018; 2:00 pm		South Alabama	W 83–74	9–11 (3–6)	Fant–Ewing Coliseum (1,635); Monroe, LA
Feb 3, 2018; 2:00 pm, ESPN3		Louisiana	L 59–80	9–12 (3–7)	Fant–Ewing Coliseum (2,269); Monroe, LA
Feb 8, 2018; 6:30 pm, ESPN3		at Georgia Southern	W 66–64 ^{OT}	10–12 (4–7)	Hanner Fieldhouse (1,510); Statesboro, GA
Feb 10, 2018; 2:15 pm, ESPN3		at Georgia State	W 90–82	11–12 (5–7)	GSU Sports Arena (1,807); Atlanta, GA
Feb 15, 2018; 7:00 pm		Texas–Arlington	W 84–71	12–12 (6–7)	Fant–Ewing Coliseum (1,439); Monroe, LA
Feb 17, 2018; 2:00 pm		Texas State	W 79–71	13–12 (7–7)	Fant–Ewing Coliseum (1,810); Monroe, LA
Feb 22, 2018; 7:00 pm		at South Alabama	W 66–62	14–12 (8–7)	Mitchell Center (2,011); Mobile, AL
Feb 24, 2018; 4:15 pm, ESPN3		at Troy	L 67–73	14–13 (8–8)	Trojan Arena (2,317); Troy, AL
Mar 1, 2018; 7:00 pm		Little Rock	W 48–44	15–13 (9–8)	Fant–Ewing Coliseum (1,537); Monroe, LA
Mar 3, 2018; 2:00 pm		Arkansas State	L 79–83	15–14 (9–9)	Fant–Ewing Coliseum (2,083); Monroe, LA
Sun Belt tournament
Mar 7, 2018; 7:30 pm, ESPN3	(6)	vs. (11) Arkansas State; First round	W 76–54	16–14	Lakefront Arena (986); New Orleans, LA
Mar 9, 2018; 7:30 pm, ESPN3	(6)	vs. (3) Georgia Southern; Quarterfinals	L 55–63	16–15	Lakefront Arena (1,462); New Orleans, LA
CIT
Mar 15, 2018*; 7:00 pm		at Austin Peay; First round – Coach John McLendon Classic	L 66–80	16–16	Dunn Center (1,228); Clarksville, TN
*Non-conference game. ^{#}Rankings from AP Poll. (#) Tournament seedings in parentheses. All times are in Central Time.
