= Mike Balado =

American basketball player and coach

Current position
- Title: Athletic director
- Team: Miami Dade College
- Conference: Southern

Playing career
- 1994–1998: St. Thomas (FL)

Coaching career (HC unless noted)
- 1998–1999: Augusta State (GA)
- 1999–2000: Augusta State (assistant)
- 2000–2002: Southridge HS (assistant)
- 2002–2003: Nova Southeastern (assistant)
- 2003–2005: Miami Dade (assistant)
- 2005–2008: Florida Atlantic (assistant)
- 2008–2009: Miami (FL) (assistant)
- 2009–2012: High Point (assistant)
- 2012–2013: FIU (assistant)
- 2013–2017: Louisville (assistant)
- 2017–2023: Arkansas State

Administrative career (AD unless noted)
- 2023–present: Miami Dade

Head coaching record
- Overall: 82–100 (.451)

Mike Balado is an American college basketball coach who was last the head coach at Arkansas State University. He was formerly an assistant coach at the University of Louisville.

== Head coaching record ==
Record table
Season	Team	Overall	Conference	Standing	Postseason
Arkansas State Red Wolves (Sun Belt Conference) (2017–2023)
2017–18	Arkansas State	11–21	6–12	11th	
2018–19	Arkansas State	13–19	7–11	9th	
2019–20	Arkansas State	16–16	8–12	T–8th	
2020–21	Arkansas State	11–13	7–8	4th (West)	
2021–22	Arkansas State	18–11	8–7	6th	
2022–23	Arkansas State	13–20	4–14	13th	
Arkansas State:		82–100 (.451)	40–64 (.385)		
Total:		82–100 (.451)			
