= 2017–18 Coastal Carolina Chanticleers men's basketball team =

American college basketball season

2017–18 Coastal Carolina Chanticleers men's basketball
- Conference: Sun Belt Conference
- Record: 14–18 (8–10 Sun Belt)
- Head coach: Cliff Ellis (11th season)
- Assistant coaches: Benny Moss; Patrice Days; Patrick Blake
- Home arena: HTC Center

2017–18 Sun Belt Conference men's basketball standings
	Conf.				Overall
Team	W		L	PCT	W		L	PCT
Louisiana	16	–	2	.889	27	–	7	.794
Georgia State †	12	–	6	.667	24	–	11	.686
Georgia Southern	11	–	7	.611	21	–	12	.636
Texas–Arlington	10	–	8	.556	21	–	13	.618
Louisiana–Monroe	9	–	9	.500	16	–	16	.500
Troy	9	–	9	.500	16	–	17	.485
Appalachian State	9	–	9	.500	15	–	18	.455
Coastal Carolina	8	–	10	.444	14	–	18	.438
South Alabama	7	–	11	.389	14	–	18	.438
Texas State	7	–	11	.389	15	–	18	.455
Arkansas State	6	–	12	.333	11	–	21	.344
Little Rock	4	–	14	.222	7	–	25	.219
† 2018 Sun Belt Conference tournament winner

The 2017–18 Coastal Carolina Chanticleers men's basketball team represented Coastal Carolina University during the 2017–18 NCAA Division I men's basketball season. The Chanticleers, led by 11th-year head coach Cliff Ellis, played their home games at the HTC Center in Conway, South Carolina as members of the Sun Belt Conference. They finished the season 14–18, 8–10 in Sun Belt play to finish in eighth place. They lost in the first round of the Sun Belt tournament to Texas State.

== Previous season ==
The Chanticleers finished the 2016–17 season 20–19, 10–8 in Sun Belt play to finish in a three-way tie for sixth place. As the No. 8 seed in the Sun Belt tournament, they defeated South Alabama before losing to Texas–Arlington in the quarterfinals. They received an invitation to the College Basketball Invitational where they defeated Hampton, Loyola (MD) and UIC to advance to the best-of-three finals series against Wyoming where they lost 2 games to 1.

== Roster ==
2017–18 Coastal Carolina Chanticleers men's basketball team
Players
Coaches

Pos.	#	Name	Height	Weight	Year	Hometown
G	0	Tre Brown	6 ft 2 in (1.88 m)	160 lb (73 kg)	Fr	Tacoma, Washington
G	1	Ajay Sanders	6 ft 4 in (1.93 m)	195 lb (88 kg)	Jr	Greenville, North Carolina
G	2	Artur Labinowicz	6 ft 4 in (1.93 m)	190 lb (86 kg)	So	Charlotte, North Carolina
G	4	Christian Adams	6 ft 3 in (1.91 m)	190 lb (86 kg)	Jr	Winston-Salem, North Carolina
G	5	Jaylen Shaw	6 ft 1 in (1.85 m)	190 lb (86 kg)	Sr	Hartsville, South Carolina
G	10	Tyrell Gumbs-Frater	6 ft 3 in (1.91 m)	180 lb (82 kg)	So	Richmond Hill, Ontario
G	11	Josh Peterson	5 ft 10 in (1.78 m)	165 lb (75 kg)	So	Woodbridge, Virginia
G	13	Matt Lindsey	6 ft 1 in (1.85 m)	190 lb (86 kg)	Jr	North Myrtle Beach, South Carolina
F	15	Amidou Bamba	6 ft 8 in (2.03 m)	240 lb (109 kg)	RS So	Toronto, Ontario
F	20	Demario Beck	6 ft 8 in (2.03 m)	220 lb (100 kg)	Sr	Cochran, Georgia
G	22	Bill Muse	6 ft 2 in (1.88 m)	190 lb (86 kg)	Jr	Muskogee, Oklahoma
C	30	Josh Coleman	6 ft 9 in (2.06 m)	240 lb (109 kg)	Jr	Alpharetta, Georgia
F	40	Zac Cuthbertson	6 ft 7 in (2.01 m)	185 lb (84 kg)	Sr	New Bern, North Carolina

Head coach

- Cliff Ellis (Florida State)

Assistant coach(es)

- Benny Moss (Charlotte)
- Patrice Days (LSU New Orleans)
- Patrick Blake (Louisville)

Legend

- (C) Team captain
- (S) Suspended
- (I) Ineligible
- (W) Walk-on
- Injured
- Current redshirt

Roster
Last update: 11-13-17

== Schedule and results ==
Date time, TV	Rank^{#}	Opponent^{#}	Result	Record	Site (attendance) city, state
Exhibition
Nov 2, 2017*; 7:00 pm		South Carolina State	W 83–69		HTC Center; Conway, SC
Non-conference regular season
Nov 10, 2017*; 7:30 pm		Piedmont International	W 102–50	1–0	HTC Center (1,380); Conway, SC
Nov 14, 2017*; 7:00 pm, ESPN3		at Lamar	L 60–66	1–1	Montagne Center (700); Beaumont, TX
Nov 17, 2017*; 2:00 pm		vs. UTSA; The Islands of the Bahamas Showcase Quarterfinals	W 83-69	2-1	Kendal Isaacs National Gymnasium (204); Nassau, Bahamas
Nov 18, 2017*; 5:00 pm		vs. Vermont; The Islands of the Bahamas Showcase Semifinals	L 67–80	2–2	Kendal Isaacs National Gymnasium (452); Nassau, Bahamas
Nov 19, 2017*; 5:00 pm		vs. Iona; The Islands of the Bahamas Showcase 3rd Place Game	W 89–84	3–2	Kendal Isaacs National Gymnasium (312); Nassau, Bahamas
Nov 22, 2017*; 3:00 pm		St. Andrews; The Islands of the Bahamas Showcase Campus Game	W 70–34	4–2	HTC Center (1,016); Conway, SC
Nov 29, 2017*; 7:00 pm		Wofford	L 81–87	4–3	HTC Center (1,446); Conway, SC
Dec 2, 2017*; 7:00 pm		Lamar	L 67–69 ^{OT}	4–4	HTC Center (1,180); Conway, SC
Dec 6, 2017*; 7:00 pm, Pirate TV		at Hampton	W 85–81	5–4	Hampton Convocation Center (3,123); Hampton, VA
Dec 9, 2017*; 12:00 pm, SECN		at South Carolina	L 78–80	5–5	Colonial Life Arena (11,734); Columbia, SC
Dec 16, 2017*; 2:00 pm		Montreat	W 83–70	6–5	HTC Center (1,052); Conway, SC
Dec 18, 2017*; 7:00 pm		Wake Forest	L 80–84	6–6	HTC Center (1,744); Conway, SC
Dec 22, 2017*; 7:00 pm		College of Charleston	L 65–67	6–7	HTC Center (1,239); Conway, SC
Sun Belt Conference regular season
Dec 29, 2017; 7:30 pm		Texas–Arlington	W 90–65	7–7 (1–0)	HTC Center (1,223); Conway, SC
Dec 31, 2017; 3:30 pm		Texas State	L 48–53	7–8 (1–1)	HTC Center (1,021); Conway, SC
Jan 4, 2018; 8:00 pm		at Louisiana–Monroe	L 72–82	7–9 (1–2)	Fant–Ewing Coliseum (1,318); Monroe, LA
Jan 6, 2018; 8:00 pm		at Louisiana	L 64–81	7–10 (1–3)	Cajundome (4,150); Lafayette, LA
Jan 11, 2018; 7:30 pm		Georgia Southern	L 66–77	7–11 (1–4)	HTC Center (1,329); Conway, SC
Jan 13, 2018; 3:30 pm, ESPN3		Georgia State	L 58–72	7–12 (1–5)	HTC Center (1,502); Conway, SC
Jan 18, 2018; 7:00 pm		at South Alabama	L 57–60	7–13 (1–6)	Mitchell Center (2,098); Mobile, AL
Jan 20, 2018; 5:15 pm, ESPN3		at Troy	W 74–73	8–13 (2–6)	Trojan Arena (2,891); Troy, AL
Jan 25, 2018; 7:30 pm		Arkansas State	W 62–47	9–13 (3–6)	HTC Center (1,322); Conway, SC
Jan 27, 2018; 3:30 pm		Little Rock	W 72–62	10–13 (4–6)	HTC Center (1,267); Conway, SC
Feb 1, 2018; 7:30 pm		at Texas State	W 56–54 ^{OT}	11–13 (5–6)	Strahan Coliseum (2,278); San Marcos, TX
Feb 3, 2018; 5:30 pm, ESPN3		at Texas–Arlington	L 80–87	11–14 (5–7)	College Park Center (2,011); Arlington, TX
Feb 10, 2018; 3:30 pm		Appalachian State	L 66–81	11–15 (5–8)	HTC Center (2,100); Conway, SC
Feb 15, 2018; 7:30 pm		Troy	L 65–66	11–16 (5–9)	HTC Center (1,518); Conway, SC
Feb 17, 2018; 3:30 pm		South Alabama	W 72–70	12–16 (6–9)	HTC Center (1,311); Conway, SC
Feb 22, 2018; 7:00 pm		at Little Rock	W 65–60	13–16 (7–9)	Jack Stephens Center (1,488); Little Rock, AR
Feb 24, 2018; 7:00 pm, ESPN3		at Arkansas State	W 88–81	14–16 (8–9)	First National Bank Arena (1,619); Jonesboro, AR
Mar 3, 2018; 3:30 pm, ESPN3		at Appalachian State	L 67–79	14–17 (8–10)	Holmes Center (1,437); Boone, NC
Sun Belt tournament
Mar 7, 2018; 12:30 pm, ESPN3	(8)	vs. (9) Texas State; First round	L 66–73	14–18	Lakefront Arena; New Orleans, LA
*Non-conference game. ^{#}Rankings from AP Poll. (#) Tournament seedings in parentheses. All times are in Eastern Time Source:.
