= 2018 Sun Belt Conference men's basketball tournament =

- Classification: Division I
- Season: 2017–18
- Teams: 12
- Site: Lakefront Arena; New Orleans, Louisiana
- Champions: Georgia State (2nd title)
- Winning coach: Ron Hunter (2nd title)
- MVP: D'Marcus Simonds (Georgia State)
- Television: ESPN3, ESPN2

2017–18 Sun Belt Conference men's basketball standings
	Conf.				Overall
Team	W		L	PCT	W		L	PCT
Louisiana	16	–	2	.889	27	–	7	.794
Georgia State †	12	–	6	.667	24	–	11	.686
Georgia Southern	11	–	7	.611	21	–	12	.636
Texas–Arlington	10	–	8	.556	21	–	13	.618
Louisiana–Monroe	9	–	9	.500	16	–	16	.500
Troy	9	–	9	.500	16	–	17	.485
Appalachian State	9	–	9	.500	15	–	18	.455
Coastal Carolina	8	–	10	.444	14	–	18	.438
South Alabama	7	–	11	.389	14	–	18	.438
Texas State	7	–	11	.389	15	–	18	.455
Arkansas State	6	–	12	.333	11	–	21	.344
Little Rock	4	–	14	.222	7	–	25	.219
† 2018 Sun Belt Conference tournament winner

The 2018 Sun Belt Conference men's basketball tournament was the postseason men's basketball tournament for the league for the 2017–18 NCAA Division I men's basketball season. It was held from March 7–11, 2018, in New Orleans, Louisiana, at Lake Front Arena. The tournament winner, Georgia State, received the conference's automatic bid to the NCAA tournament.

== Seeds ==
All 12 conference teams were eligible for the tournament. The top four teams received a bye to the quarterfinals of the tournament. Teams were seeded by record within the conference, with a tiebreaker system to seed teams with identical conference records.

Seed	School	Conference	Tiebreaker
1	Louisiana	16–2	
2	Georgia State	12–6	
3	Georgia Southern	11–7	
4	Texas–Arlington	10–8	
5	Appalachian State	9–9	2–1 vs tied teams
6	Louisiana–Monroe	9–9	1–0 vs Georgia State
7	Troy	9–9	0–2 vs Georgia State
8	Coastal Carolina	8–10	
9	Texas State	7–11	1–0 vs South Alabama
10	South Alabama	7–11	0–1 vs Texas State
11	Arkansas State	6–12	
12	Little Rock	4–14	

== Schedule ==
Game	Time	Matchup	Score	Television
First round – Wednesday, March 7, 2018
1	11:30 am	No. 8 Coastal Carolina vs. No. 9 Texas State	66–73	ESPN3
2	2:00 pm	No. 5 Appalachian State vs. No. 12 Little Rock	93–64	ESPN3
3	5:00 pm	No. 7 Troy vs. No. 10 South Alabama	69–62	ESPN3
4	7:30 pm	No. 6 Louisiana–Monroe vs. No. 11 Arkansas State	76–54	ESPN3
Quarterfinals – Friday, March 9, 2018
5	11:30 am	No. 1 Louisiana vs. No. 9 Texas State	80–54	ESPN3
6	2:00 pm	No. 4 Texas–Arlington vs. No. 5 Appalachian State	84–63	ESPN3
7	5:00 pm	No. 2 Georgia State vs. No. 7 Troy	73–51	ESPN3
8	7:30 pm	No. 3 Georgia Southern vs. No. 6 Louisiana–Monroe	63–55	ESPN3
Semifinals – Saturday, March 10, 2018
9	11:30 am	No. 1 Louisiana vs. No. 4 Texas–Arlington	68–71	ESPN3
10	2:00 pm	No. 2 Georgia State vs. No. 3 Georgia Southern	73–67	ESPN3
Championship – Sunday, March 11, 2018
11	1:00 pm	No. 2 Georgia State vs. No. 4 Texas–Arlington	74–61	ESPN2
Game times are in Central Time. Rankings denote tournament seed.

== Bracket ==
First round Wednesday, March 7 ESPN3
8	Coastal Carolina	66
9	Texas State	73
5	Appalachian State	93
12	Little Rock	64
7	Troy	69
10	South Alabama	62
6	Louisiana–Monroe	76
11	Arkansas State	54

Quarterfinals; Friday, March 9 ESPN3
1	Louisiana	80
9	Texas State	54
4	Texas–Arlington	84
5	Appalachian State	63
2	Georgia State	73
7	Troy	51
3	Georgia Southern	63
6	Louisiana–Monroe	55

Semifinals; Saturday, March 10; ESPN3
1	Louisiana	68
4	Texas–Arlington	71
2	Georgia State	73
3	Georgia Southern	67

Championship; Sunday, March 11; ESPN2
4	Texas–Arlington	61
2	Georgia State	74

== See also ==
2018 Sun Belt Conference women's basketball tournament
