= 2017–18 Rice Owls men's basketball team =

American college basketball season

2017–18 Rice Owls men's basketball
- Conference: Conference USA
- Record: 7–24 (4–14 C-USA)
- Head coach: Scott Pera (1st season)
- Assistant coaches: Chris Kreider; Mark Linebaugh; Omar Mance
- Home arena: Tudor Fieldhouse

2017–18 Conference USA men's basketball standings
	Conf.				Overall
Team	W		L	PCT	W		L	PCT
Middle Tennessee	16	–	2	.889	25	–	8	.758
Old Dominion	15	–	3	.833	25	–	7	.781
Western Kentucky	14	–	4	.778	27	–	11	.711
Marshall †	12	–	6	.667	25	–	11	.694
UTSA	11	–	7	.611	20	–	15	.571
UAB	10	–	8	.556	20	–	13	.606
North Texas	8	–	10	.444	20	–	18	.526
FIU	8	–	10	.444	14	–	18	.438
Southern Miss	7	–	11	.389	16	–	18	.471
Louisiana Tech	7	–	11	.389	17	–	16	.515
Florida Atlantic	6	–	12	.333	12	–	19	.387
UTEP	6	–	12	.333	11	–	20	.355
Rice	4	–	14	.222	7	–	24	.226
Charlotte	2	–	16	.111	6	–	23	.207
† 2018 C-USA Tournament winner

The 2017–18 Rice Owls men's basketball team represented Rice University during the 2017–18 NCAA Division I men's basketball season. The Owls, led by first-year head coach Scott Pera, played their home games at Tudor Fieldhouse in Houston, Texas as members of Conference USA. They finished the season 7–24, 4–14 in C-USA play to finish in 13th place and failed to qualify for the C-USA tournament.

== Previous season ==
The Owls finished the 2016–17 season 23–12, 11–7 in C-USA play to finish in fifth place. They defeated Southern Miss in the first round of the C-USA tournament before losing in the quarterfinals to UTEP. They received an invitation to the College Basketball Invitational where they defeated San Francisco in the first round before losing in the quarterfinals to Utah Valley.

On March 21, 2017, head coach Mike Rhoades resigned to become the head coach at VCU. He finished at Rice with a three-year record of 47–52. On March 23, the school promoted assistant coach Scott Pera to head coach.

== Offseason ==
=== Departures ===
Name	Number	Pos.	Height	Weight	Year	Hometown	Notes
Marcus Evans	2	G	6'2"	195	Sophomore	Chesapeake, VA	Transferred to VCU
Egor Koulechov	4	G/F	6'5"	210	RS Junior	Volgograd, Russia	Graduate transferred to Florida
Corey Douglas	11	F	6'8"	190	Freshman	Louisville, KY	Transferred to Tallahassee CC
Marquez Letcher-Ellis	12	F	6'7"	205	Sophomore	Houston, TX	Transferred to Nevada
Chad Lott	21	G	6'3"	190	RS Freshman	Shreveport, LA	Transferred to Howard
Marcus Jackson	22	G	6'3"	185	Senior	Acton, CA	Graduate transferred to UC Santa Barbara
Harrison Brown	31	G/F	6'4'	200	Sophomore	Austin, TX	Walk-on; left the team for personal reasons
Andrew Drone	54	C	6'10"	260	Senior	Ridgway, IL	Graduated

=== Incoming transfers ===
Name	Number	Pos.	Height	Weight	Year	Hometown	Previous School
A. J. Lapray	2	G	6'5"	190	RS Senior	Salem, OR	Transferred from Pepperdine. Will be eligible to play immediately since Lapray graduated from Pepperdine.
Dylan Jones	4	F	6'8"	215	RS Senior	Houston, TX	Transferred from Penn. Will be eligible to play immediately since Jones graduated from Penn.
Josh Parrish	12	G	6'5"	220	Sophomore	Arlington, TX	Transferred from TCU. Under NCAA transfer rules, Parrish will have to sit out for the 2017–18 season. Will have three years of remaining eligibility.

=== 2017 recruiting class ===
College recruiting
Name	Hometown	School	Height	Weight	Commit date
Miles Lester; PG	Wichita, KS	Wilbraham & Monson Academy	6 ft 1 in (1.85 m)	N/A	
Miles Lester; PG	Recruit ratings: Scout: Rivals: 247Sports: (NR)				
Najja Hunter; PG	Brooklyn, NY	St Benedict's Preparatory School	6 ft 5 in (1.96 m)	185 lb (84 kg)	Apr 15, 2017
Najja Hunter; PG	Recruit ratings: Scout: Rivals: 247Sports: (NR)				
Malik Osborne; SF	Matteson, IL	Don Bosco Prep Academy	6 ft 5 in (1.96 m)	185 lb (84 kg)	Apr 24, 2017
Malik Osborne; SF	Recruit ratings: Scout: Rivals: 247Sports: (NR)				
Overall recruit ranking:
Note: In many cases, Scout, Rivals, 247Sports, On3, and ESPN may conflict in their listings of height and weight.; In these cases, the average was taken. ESPN grades are on a 100-point scale.; Sources: "2017 Team Ranking". Rivals.

=== 2018 recruiting class ===
College recruiting (2018)
Name	Hometown	School	Height	Weight	Commit date
Chris Mullins #55 SG	Mansfield, TX	Timberview High School	6 ft 2 in (1.88 m)	N/A	Aug 23, 2017
Chris Mullins #55 SG	Recruit ratings: Scout: Rivals: 247Sports: (3)				
Trey Murphy III; SG	Cary, NC	Cary Academy	6 ft 4 in (1.93 m)	165 lb (75 kg)	Nov 8, 2017
Trey Murphy III; SG	Recruit ratings: Scout: Rivals: 247Sports: (0)				
Quentin Millora-Brown; PF	Lorton, VA	Bishop O'Connell High School	6 ft 9 in (2.06 m)	205 lb (93 kg)	Nov 8, 2017
Quentin Millora-Brown; PF	Recruit ratings: Scout: Rivals: 247Sports: (0)				
Payton Moore; SG	Los Angeles, CA	Windward School	6 ft 4 in (1.93 m)	175 lb (79 kg)	Nov 8, 2017
Payton Moore; SG	Recruit ratings: Scout: Rivals: 247Sports: (0)				
Drew Peterson; SF	Libertyville, IL	Libertyville High Scoool	6 ft 7 in (2.01 m)	180 lb (82 kg)	Apr 10, 2018
Drew Peterson; SF	Recruit ratings: Scout: Rivals: 247Sports: (0)				
Overall recruit ranking:
Note: In many cases, Scout, Rivals, 247Sports, On3, and ESPN may conflict in their listings of height and weight.; In these cases, the average was taken. ESPN grades are on a 100-point scale.; Sources: "2018 Team Ranking". Rivals.

== Roster ==
2017–18 Rice Owls men's basketball team
Players
Coaches

Pos.	#	Name	Height	Weight	Year	Previous school	Hometown
G	0	Connor Cashaw	6 ft 5 in (1.96 m)	205 lb (93 kg)	Jr	Stevenson High School	Lincolnshire, Illinois
G	2	A. J. Lapray	6 ft 5 in (1.96 m)	190 lb (86 kg)	RS Sr	Sprague HS; Pepperdine	Salem, Oregon
G	3	Ako Adams	6 ft 2 in (1.88 m)	170 lb (77 kg)	So	Bishop Denis J. O'Connell High School	Washington, D.C.
F	4	Dylan Jones	6 ft 8 in (2.03 m)	215 lb (98 kg)	RS Sr	The Village School; Penn	Houston, Texas
G	5	Addison Owen (W)	6 ft 5 in (1.96 m)	185 lb (84 kg)	So	The Paideia School	Atlanta, Georgia
F	10	Robert Martin	6 ft 6 in (1.98 m)	220 lb (100 kg)	So	Tilton School	Pittsburgh, Pennsylvania
G	11	Miles Lester	6 ft 0 in (1.83 m)	170 lb (77 kg)	Fr	Wilbraham & Monson Academy	Wichita, Kansas
G	12	Josh Parrish (redshirt)	6 ft 5 in (1.96 m)	210 lb (95 kg)	So	Seguin High School; TCU	Arlington, Texas
F	13	Malik Osborne	6 ft 8 in (2.03 m)	200 lb (91 kg)	Fr	Don Bosco Prep	Matteson, Illinois
G	15	Bishop Mency	6 ft 5 in (1.96 m)	215 lb (98 kg)	Sr	Chino Hills High School	Chino Hills, California
G	20	Grant Youngkin (W)	6 ft 3 in (1.91 m)	190 lb (86 kg)	So	St. Albans School	Washington, D.C.
G	24	J. T. Trauber (W)	5 ft 10 in (1.78 m)	165 lb (75 kg)	Sr	St. John's School	Houston, Texas
F	30	Austin Meyer	6 ft 9 in (2.06 m)	235 lb (107 kg)	So	Rouse High School	Pflugerville, Texas
F	35	Tim Harrison	6 ft 8 in (2.03 m)	220 lb (100 kg)	So	Francis W. Parker School	San Diego, California

Head coach

- Scott Pera (Penn State)

Assistant coach(es)

- Chris Kreider (Lebanon Valley)
- Mark Linebaugh (Colgate)
- Omar Mance (Rice)

Legend

- (C) Team captain
- (S) Suspended
- (I) Ineligible
- (W) Walk-on
- Injured
- Current redshirt

Roster

== Schedule and results ==
Date time, TV	Opponent	Result	Record	Site (attendance) city, state
Exhibition
Nov 4, 2017*; 7:00 pm	Wayland Baptist	W 79–72		Tudor Fieldhouse; Houston, TX
Non-conference regular season
Nov 10, 2017*; 7:00 pm	Eastern Kentucky; MGM Resorts Main Event campus-site game	L 72–73	0–1	Tudor Fieldhouse (2,001); Houston, TX
Nov 14, 2017*; 7:00 pm	Georgia State; MGM Resorts Main Event campus-site game	L 54–75	0–2	Tudor Fieldhouse (1,208); Houston, TX
Nov 17, 2017*; 6:30 pm	at Northwestern State	W 87–65	1–2	Prather Coliseum (1,312); Natchitoches, LA
Nov 20, 2017*; 9:00 pm	vs. UNLV; MGM Resorts Main Event Heavyweight semifinals	L 68–95	1–3	T-Mobile Arena (8,107); Paradise, NV
Nov 22, 2017*; 9:00 pm, ESPNU	vs. Ole Miss; MGM Resorts Main Event Heavyweight consolation game	L 62–79	1–4	T-Mobile Arena (8,424); Paradise, NV
Nov 25, 2017*; 6:30 pm	St. Thomas (TX)	W 70–59	2–4	Tudor Fieldhouse (1,439); Houston, TX
Nov 29, 2017*; 6:30 pm, ESPN3	at Texas–Arlington	L 49–69	2–5	College Park Center (1,649); Arlington, TX
Dec 2, 2017*; 2:00 pm	Texas–Rio Grande Valley	L 67–69	2–6	Tudor Fieldhouse (1,548); Houston, TX
Dec 9, 2017*; 2:00 pm, ESPN3	at Stephen F. Austin	L 62–81	2–7	William R. Johnson Coliseum (4,071); Nacogdoches, TX
Dec 14, 2017*; 11:30 am	St. Edward's	W 91–86	3–7	Tudor Fieldhouse (5,208); Houston, TX
Dec 16, 2017*; 7:00 pm	at No. 24 Texas Tech	L 53–73	3–8	Lubbock Municipal Coliseum (7,034); Lubbock, TX
Dec 19, 2017*; 8:30 pm, ATTSN	at New Mexico	L 69–78	3–9	Dreamstyle Arena (9,415); Albuquerque, NM
Dec 22, 2017*; 7:00 pm	Texas State	L 66–74	3–10	Tudor Fieldhouse (2,913); Houston, TX
Conference USA regular season
Dec 28, 2017; 7:00 pm	at UTSA	L 66–79	3–11 (0–1)	Convocation Center (1,163); San Antonio, TX
Dec 30, 2017; 8:00 pm	at UTEP	L 62–80	3–12 (0–2)	Don Haskins Center (6,147); El Paso, TX
Jan 4, 2018; 7:00 pm	Old Dominion	L 75–82 ^{OT}	3–13 (0–3)	Tudor Fieldhouse (1,313); Houston, TX
Jan 6, 2018; 2:00 pm	Charlotte	W 73–64	4–13 (1–3)	Tudor Fieldhouse (1,482); Houston, TX
Jan 13, 2018; 2:00 pm	North Texas	L 78–85	4–14 (1–4)	Tudor Fieldhouse (2,487); Houston, TX
Jan 18, 2018; 7:00 pm	at Southern Miss	L 75–86	4–15 (1–5)	Reed Green Coliseum (2,001); Hattiesburg, MS
Jan 20, 2018; 6:00 pm	at Louisiana Tech	L 54–69	4–16 (1–6)	Thomas Assembly Center (3,836); Ruston, LA
Jan 25, 2018; 7:00 pm	FIU	W 73–64	5–16 (2–6)	Tudor Fieldhouse (1,485); Houston, TX
Jan 27, 2018; 2:00 pm	Florida Atlantic	L 62–63	5–17 (2–7)	Tudor Fieldhouse (1,866); Houston, TX
Feb 3, 2018; 5:00 pm, ESPN3	at North Texas	L 70–74	5–18 (2–8)	The Super Pit (2,322); Denton, TX
Feb 8, 2018; 6:30 pm, Stadium	at Middle Tennessee	L 75–94	5–19 (2–9)	Murphy Center (5,602); Murfreesboro, TN
Feb 10, 2018; 7:00 pm	at UAB	L 56–61	5–20 (2–10)	Bartow Arena (3,703); Birmingham, AL
Feb 15, 2018; 7:00 pm	Marshall	L 80–93	5–21 (2–11)	Tudor Fieldhouse (1,694); Houston, TX
Feb 17, 2018; 7:00 pm, ESPN3	Western Kentucky	L 66–85	5–22 (2–12)	Tudor Fieldhouse (4,246); Houston, TX
Feb 22, 2018; 6:00 pm	at Florida Atlantic	W 79–76 ^{OT}	6–22 (3–12)	FAU Arena (1,188); Boca Raton, FL
Feb 24, 2018; 6:00 pm	at FIU	L 64–67	6–23 (3–13)	FIU Arena (4,580); Miami, FL
Mar 1, 2018; 7:00 pm	UTEP	W 76–70	7–23 (4–13)	Tudor Fieldhouse (1,802); Houston, TX
Mar 3, 2018; 7:00 pm	UTSA	L 60–79	7–24 (4–14)	Tudor Fieldhouse (3,738); Houston, TX
*Non-conference game. ^{#}Rankings from AP Poll. (#) Tournament seedings in parentheses. All times are in Central Time.

== See also ==
- 2017–18 Rice Owls women's basketball team
