= Cedric Russell =

American basketball player (born 1999)

No. 0 – RheinStars Köln
- Position: Guard
- League: ProA

Personal information
- Born: 6 March 1999 (age 27) Alexandria, Louisiana, United States
- Listed height: 1.88 m (6 ft 2 in)
- Listed weight: 190 lb (86 kg)

Career information
- High school: Peabody Magnet High School
- College: Louisiana (2017–2021); Ohio State (2021–2022)
- Playing career: 2022–present

Career history
- 2022–2023: Tamiš
- 2023–2024: MZT Skopje
- 2024: Al Nassr BC
- 2024–2025: Traiskirchen Lions
- 2025: Trepça
- 2025–present: RheinStars Köln

Cedric Russell (born 6 March 1999) is an American professional basketball player for RheinStars Köln of the German ProA. He attended Peabody Magnet High School in Alexandria, Louisiana and played for the historic Warhorse basketball program under the legendary Neismith Basketball Hall of Fame inductee finalist(class of '24) head coach Coach Charles Smith. Also attending and playing for the Louisiana Ragin' Cajuns and The Ohio State University Buckeyes.

== Professional career ==
On 31 July 2023, Russell signed a contract with MZT Skopje of the Macedonian League for the 2023–24 season. On October 10, 2023, he made his debut in ABA League Second Division for MZT Skopje against KK Cedevita Junior where he scored 14 points

On November 7, 2025, he signed with RheinStars Köln of the German ProA.
