= 2009 Southland Conference men's basketball tournament =

- Classification: Division I
- Season: 2008–09
- Teams: 8
- Site: Merrell Center; Katy, Texas
- Champions: Stephen F. Austin (1st title)
- Winning coach: Danny Kaspar (1st title)
- MVP: Matt Kingsley (Stephen F. Austin)
- Television: ESPN2

2008–09 Southland Conference men's basketball standings
	Conf.				Overall
Team	W		L	PCT	W		L	PCT
East
Stephen F. Austin †	13	–	3	.813	24	–	8	.750
Nicholls State	12	–	4	.750	20	–	11	.645
Southeastern Louisiana	7	–	9	.438	13	–	17	.433
McNeese State	5	–	11	.313	11	–	18	.379
Northwestern State	3	–	13	.188	11	–	20	.355
Central Arkansas	3	–	13	.188	10	–	19	.345
West
Sam Houston State	12	–	4	.750	18	–	12	.600
Texas A&M–Corpus Christi	11	–	5	.688	18	–	15	.545
Texas–Arlington	9	–	7	.563	16	–	14	.533
UTSA	8	–	8	.500	19	–	13	.594
Texas State	7	–	9	.438	14	–	16	.467
Lamar	6	–	10	.375	15	–	15	.500
† 2009 Southland tournament winner

The 2009 Southland Conference men's basketball tournament, a part of the 2008-09 NCAA Division I men's basketball season, took place March 12–15, 2009 at the Merrell Center in Katy, Texas. The winner of the tournament received the Southland Conference's automatic bid to the 2009 NCAA Tournament.

== Format ==
The top eight eligible men's basketball teams in the Southland Conference received a berth in the conference tournament. After the conference season, teams were seeded by conference record. The first round match-ups were as shown below.

== Bracket ==
Quarterfinals; Thursday, March 12
1	Stephen F. Austin	67
8	Southeastern Louisiana	56
4	Texas A&M–Corpus Christi	79
5	Texas–Arlington	72
3	Sam Houston State	74
6	UTSA	83
2	Nicholls State	80
7	Texas State	75

Semifinals; Friday, March 13
1	Stephen F. Austin	63
4	Texas A&M–Corpus Christi	60
6	UTSA	57
2	Nicholls State	55

Finals; Sunday, March 15
1	Stephen F. Austin	68
6	UTSA	57

All times Eastern.

== Championship game ==
In the title game, Stephen F. Austin won their first conference title and clinched their first birth to the Division I NCAA Men’s Basketball Championship. Matt Kingsley, a fifth-year senior, led the Lumberjacks with 20 points in the 68–57 win over Texas-San Antonio. Kingsley was named the tournament MVP. The Lumberjacks also got 16 points apiece from Eddie Williams and Josh Alexander.

Devin Gibson led UTSA with a game-high 23 points. While the game was close throughout, SFA never trailed in the first half, and led 37–28 at halftime. They closed the first half on a 20–6 run that culminated with a three-pointer from Walt Harris. Despite Gibson's best efforts, the Roadrunners never got closer than five points behind the second half.

The Lumberjacks became the fifteenth different team to win the Southland Conference Tournament.
