= 2008–09 Stephen F. Austin Lumberjacks basketball team =

American college basketball season

2008–09 Stephen F. Austin Lumberjacks basketball

Southland Regular Season and Tournament Champions

NCAA tournament, First Round
- Conference: Southland Conference
- East
- Record: 24–8 (13–3 Southland)
- Head coach: Danny Kaspar (9th season)
- Assistant coach: Ulric Maligi (2nd season)
- Home arena: William R. Johnson Coliseum

2008–09 Southland Conference men's basketball standings
	Conf.				Overall
Team	W		L	PCT	W		L	PCT
East
Stephen F. Austin †	13	–	3	.813	24	–	8	.750
Nicholls State	12	–	4	.750	20	–	11	.645
Southeastern Louisiana	7	–	9	.438	13	–	17	.433
McNeese State	5	–	11	.313	11	–	18	.379
Northwestern State	3	–	13	.188	11	–	20	.355
Central Arkansas	3	–	13	.188	10	–	19	.345
West
Sam Houston State	12	–	4	.750	18	–	12	.600
Texas A&M–Corpus Christi	11	–	5	.688	18	–	15	.545
Texas–Arlington	9	–	7	.563	16	–	14	.533
UTSA	8	–	8	.500	19	–	13	.594
Texas State	7	–	9	.438	14	–	16	.467
Lamar	6	–	10	.375	15	–	15	.500
† 2009 Southland tournament winner

The 2008–09 Stephen F. Austin Lumberjacks basketball team represented Stephen F. Austin University during the 2008–09 NCAA Division I men's basketball season. The Lumberjacks were led by head coach Danny Kaspar and played their home games at the William R. Johnson Coliseum. They were members of the Southland Conference. The Lumberjacks finished the season 24–8, 13–3 in Southland play to claim the Southland regular season championship. They were champions of the Southland Conference tournament to earn an automatic bid to the NCAA tournament – the first appearance in school history. As No. 14 seed in the South region, they lost in the Round of 64 to No. 3 seed Syracuse.

== Roster ==
2008–09 Stephen F. Austin Lumberjacks men's basketball team
Players
Coaches

Pos.	#	Name	Height	Weight	Year	Hometown
G	0	Josh Alexander	6 ft 4 in (1.93 m)	210 lb (95 kg)	Sr	Shreveport, Louisiana
G	12	Eddie Williams	6 ft 2 in (1.88 m)	190 lb (86 kg)	So	Lawton, Oklahoma
C	44	Matt Kingsley	6 ft 8 in (2.03 m)	230 lb (104 kg)	Sr	Houston, Texas

Head coach

- Danny Kaspar

Assistant coach(es)

- Ulric Maligi

Legend

- (C) Team captain
- (S) Suspended
- (I) Ineligible
- (W) Walk-on
- Injured
- Current redshirt

== Schedule and results ==
Date time, TV	Rank^{#}	Opponent^{#}	Result	Record	Site (attendance) city, state
Non-conference regular season
Nov 14, 2008*; 7:00 p.m.		Howard Payne	W 77–38	1–0	William R. Johnson Coliseum (4,176); Nacogdoches, Texas
Nov 18, 2008*; 7:00 p.m.		at Texas A&M	L 48–55	1–1	Reed Arena (7,595); College Station, Texas
Nov 25, 2008*; 7:55 p.m.		at Louisiana-Monroe	L 58–60	1–2	Fant-Ewing Coliseum (838); Monroe, Louisiana
Nov 29, 2008*; 6:12 p.m.		Texas College	W 83–42	2–2	William R. Johnson Coliseum (2,136); Nacogdoches, Texas
Dec 2, 2008*; 5:30 p.m.		Jackson State	W 73–59	3–2	William R. Johnson Coliseum (4,533); Nacogdoches, Texas
Dec 6, 2008*; 6:00 p.m.		Texas Wesleyan	W 92–42	4–2	William R. Johnson Coliseum (1,323); Nacogdoches, Texas
Dec 12, 2008*; 5:00 p.m.		vs. North Dakota State	W 112–111 ^{3OT}	5–2	Knapp Center (4,865); Des Moines, Iowa
Dec 13, 2008*; 7:30 p.m.		at Drake	W 66–64	6–2	Knapp Center (6,345); Des Moines, Iowa
Dec 19, 2008*; 7:00 p.m.		vs. Austin Peay	W 93–54	7–2	Bud Walton Arena (300); Fayetteville, Arkansas
Dec 20, 2008*; 7:05 p.m.		at Arkansas	L 51–67	7–3	Bud Walton Arena (13,872); Fayetteville, Arkansas
Jan 1, 2009*; 3:00 p.m.		at Texas Tech	L 55–69	7–4	United Spirit Arena (9,436); Lubbock, Texas
Jan 3, 2009*; 6:00 p.m.		Jarvis Christian	W 69–46	8–4	William R. Johnson Coliseum (1,376); Nacogdoches, Texas
Southland Regular season
Jan 10, 2009; 2:05 p.m.		Sam Houston State	W 75–73	9–4 (1–0)	William R. Johnson Coliseum (4,927); Nacogdoches, Texas
Jan 14, 2009; 7:00 p.m.		at Central Arkansas	W 72–55	10–4 (2–0)	Farris Center (866); Conway, Arkansas
Jan 17, 2009; 6:00 p.m.		Nicholls State	W 55–40	11–4 (3–0)	William R. Johnson Coliseum (3,375); Nacogdoches, Texas
Jan 21, 2009; 7:00 p.m.		at Texas-Arlington	L 52–67	11–5 (3–1)	Texas Hall (1,107); Arlington, Texas
Jan 24, 2009; 3:00 p.m.		at Southeastern Louisiana	W 60–49	12–5 (4–1)	University Center (1,063); Hammond, Louisiana
Jan 28, 2009; 7:00 p.m.		Northwestern State	W 73–45	13–5 (5–1)	William R. Johnson Coliseum (2,176); Nacogdoches, Texas
Jan 31, 2009; 7:40 p.m.		McNeese State	W 43–41	14–5 (6–1)	William R. Johnson Coliseum (3,745); Nacogdoches, Texas
Feb 4, 2009; 6:30 p.m.		at Nicholls State	L 50–57	14–6 (6–2)	Stopher Gymnasium (2,696); Thibodaux, Louisiana
Feb 7, 2009; 6:00 p.m.		Lamar	W 74–62	15–6 (7–2)	William R. Johnson Coliseum (4,983); Nacogdoches, Texas
Feb 11, 2009; 7:00 p.m.		at Northwestern State	W 59–51	16–6 (8–2)	Prather Coliseum (1,331); Natchitoches, Louisiana
Feb 14, 2009; 5:00 p.m.		at McNeese State	L 56–59	16–7 (8–3)	Burton Coliseum (1,077); Lake Charles, Louisiana
Feb 21, 2009; 6:00 p.m.		Southeastern Louisiana	W 45–38	17–7 (9–3)	William R. Johnson Coliseum (2,836); Nacogdoches, Texas
Feb 25, 2009; 7:00 p.m.		Texas State	W 68–52	18–7 (10–3)	William R. Johnson Coliseum (2,365); Nacogdoches, Texas
Feb 28, 2009; 7:00 p.m.		at Texas A&M-Corpus Christi	W 71–66	19–7 (11–3)	American Bank Center (1,670); Corpus Christi, Texas
Mar 4, 2009; 7:00 p.m.		Central Arkansas	W 61–39	20–7 (12–3)	William R. Johnson Coliseum (2,874); Nacogdoches, Texas
Mar 7, 2009; 7:00 p.m.		at UTSA	W 66–62	21–7 (13–3)	Convocation Center (2,025); San Antonio, Texas
Southland tournament
Mar 12, 2009*; 6:00 p.m.		vs. Southeastern Louisiana; Semifinals	W 67–56	22–7	Merrell Center (968); Katy, Texas
Mar 13, 2009*; 8:33 p.m.		vs. Texas A&M-Corpus Christi; Semifinals	W 63–60	23–7	Merrell Center (1,510); Katy, Texas
Mar 15, 2009*; 12:03 p.m.		vs. UTSA; Championship Game	W 68–57	24–7	Merrell Center (2,531); Katy, Texas
NCAA tournament
Mar 20, 2009*; 12:15 p.m.	(14 S)	vs. (3 S) No. 13 Syracuse; First Round	L 44–59	24–8	American Airlines Arena (10,163); Miami, Florida
*Non-conference game. ^{#}Rankings from AP poll. (#) Tournament seedings in parentheses. S=South. All times are in Central Time.

== Awards and honors ==
- Matt Kingsley – Southland Player of the Year
