= NCAA Division I women's basketball conference tournaments =

The NCAA Division I women's basketball conference tournaments in college basketball are tournaments held at the end of the regular season to determine a conference tournament champion. It is usually held in four rounds, but can vary, depending on the conference. All Division I Conferences hold a conference tournament except the Ivy League, which determines a champion based solely on regular season standings. Winners of each tournament and the Ivy League champion get automatic bids to the NCAA Tournament.
