= Matt Kingsley =

Matt Kingsley may refer to:

- Matt Kingsley (footballer)
- Matt Kingsley (basketball)
