= Terrence Johnson (basketball) =

American college basketball coach

Current position
- Title: Head coach
- Team: Texas State
- Conference: Pac-12
- Record: 107–81 (.569)

Biographical details
- Born: August 10, 1978 (age 48); New Orleans, Louisiana, U.S.
- Education: Southern; Prairie View A&M

Coaching career (HC unless noted)
- 2010–2012: Samford (assistant)
- 2015–2020: Texas State (assistant)
- 2020–present: Texas State

Head coaching record
- Overall: 107–81 (.569)
- Tournaments: 0–1 (NIT)

Accomplishments and honors

Championships
- 2 Sun Belt regular season (2021, 2022)

Awards
- 2× Sun Belt Coach of the Year (2021, 2022)

Terrence Johnson (born August 10, 1978) is an American college basketball coach who is the current head coach of the Texas State Bobcats men's basketball team.

== Coaching career ==
The son of a basketball coach, Johnson began coaching at the high school level, including at St. Bernard High School in Louisiana and Alief Elsik High School in the Houston area, while also working as a personal trainer and AAU coach for many future college basketball players. In 2010, he'd be hired by Jimmy Tillette as an assistant coach at Samford where he'd stay until 2012 before returning to the Houston area and the AAU ranks. Johnson would make his return to college coach when he joined Danny Kaspar's staff at Texas State in 2015 as an assistant coach. In 2020 when Kaspar resigned after being accused of making racially insensitive remarks, Johnson was promoted to the head coaching position on an interim basis.

After guiding the Bobcats to an 18–7 and a Sun Belt regular season title and earning conference Coach of the Year honors, Johnson was named the permanent head coach on March 11, 2021.

== Head coaching record ==
Record table
| Season | Team | Overall | Conference | Standing | Postseason |
|---|---|---|---|---|---|
Texas State Bobcats (Sun Belt) (2020–2026)
| 2020–21 | Texas State | 18–7 | 12–3 | 1st (West) | |
| 2021–22 | Texas State | 21–8 | 12–3 | 1st | NIT First Round |
| 2022–23 | Texas State | 16–19 | 6–12 | 11th | |
| 2023–24 | Texas State | 17–18 | 7–11 | T–10th | |
| 2024–25 | Texas State | 16–16 | 9–9 | 7th | |
| 2025–26 | Texas State | 19–13 | 11–7 | T–2nd | |
Texas State Bobcats (Pac-12) (2026–present)
| 2026–27 | Texas State | | | | |
| Texas State: | | 107–81 (.569) | 57–45 (.559) | | |
| Total: | | 107–81 (.569) | | | |
National champion Postseason invitational champion Conference regular season champion Conference regular season and conference tournament champion Division regular season champion Division regular season and conference tournament champion Conference tournament champion
