= College GameDay (basketball TV program) =

American television program

- Current logo
- Starring: Men's: Rece Davis; Seth Greenberg; Jay Bilas; Jay Williams; Andraya Carter; Pete Thamel; Women's: Christine Williamson; Andraya Carter; Carolyn Peck; Rebecca Lobo; Chiney Ogwumike; Holly Rowe
- Country of origin: United States

Production
- Running time: 60–120 minutes

Original release
- Network: ESPN, ESPN2, ESPNU, and ABC
- Release: January 22, 2005 – present

College GameDay (branded as ESPN College GameDay covered by State Farm for sponsorship reasons) is an ESPN program that covers college basketball and is a spin-off of the successful college football version. Since debuting on January 22, 2005, it airs on ESPN Saturdays in the conference play section of the college basketball season at 10 or 11 A.M. ET at a different game site each week. Before 2015, the college basketball version always appeared at the ESPN Saturday Primetime game location. Since the 2014–2015 season, the show has appeared at a top game of the week, similar to the college football version. The program has also appeared at the site of the Final Four.

In 2005, the host of the show the first four weeks was Rece Davis, but then the last four weeks Chris Fowler hosted the show. Since 2006, Davis has been the exclusive host of the show. Since the show debuted, Davis has been joined by Digger Phelps, Jalen Rose, Jay Bilas, Hubert Davis, Seth Greenberg, Jay Williams, LaPhonso Ellis and Andraya Carter as analysts. In 2008 during Championship Week, Bob Knight joined the cast, where he remained until 2012. Andy Katz has also served as a feature reporter giving up to the minute news and reports.

When College GameDay tipped off its 7th season on January 15, 2011, the show expanded to two hours, with the first hour airing on ESPNU, followed by the second hour on ESPN. The first game of the 2011 schedule marked the first time the show has originated from a site that has featured a men's and women's game played in the same day.

Duke – North Carolina is the most featured matchup, appearing 23 times on College GameDay. The next closest is Florida – Kentucky with 8 appearances. Arizona – UCLA, Kansas – Kentucky and Kansas – Texas currently sit at 4.

== History ==
The program has appeared in many different spots throughout each basketball arena. At Kansas, they were in the program's museum; at Kentucky, they were at the entrance of the arena; at UConn, they were on the concourse; at Gonzaga, Florida, and Marquette, they were on the court; and at Duke, they were in Krzyzewskiville, the tent village outside Cameron Indoor Stadium. It is also worth noting that in recent years (except for the Final Four), the morning airings of this program have taken place on the court.

Through the 2023–2024 basketball & football seasons, 42 schools (Alabama, Arizona, Arkansas, Auburn, Baylor, Boston College, Clemson, Colorado, Duke, Florida, Florida State, Houston, Indiana, Iowa State, Kansas, Kansas State, Kentucky, Louisville, LSU, Memphis, Michigan, Michigan State, Missouri, North Carolina, North Carolina State, Notre Dame, Ohio State, Oklahoma, Oklahoma State, Oregon, Pittsburgh, Purdue, Tennessee, Texas, Texas A&M, Texas Tech, UCLA, Vanderbilt, Virginia Tech, Washington, West Virginia and Wisconsin) have hosted College GameDay for both basketball and football events. With the addition of Women's teams also hosting College GameDay, only 4 schools: LSU, Tennessee, UConn and Virginia Tech have hosted both Men and Women's programs.

Starting with the fourth season (2008), the basketball version of GameDay is broadcast in high-definition on ESPN HD.

On January 16, 2010, the 6th-season premiere of College GameDay, the show was broadcast live from the site of a women's college basketball game for the first time ever as it made an appearance at Harry A. Gampel Pavilion on the main campus of the University of Connecticut in Storrs, Connecticut. The show covered the women's college basketball game between Notre Dame Fighting Irish and the Connecticut Huskies.

On March 9, 2013, College GameDay had a men's doubleheader from 2 different sites (Washington, D.C., and Chapel Hill, North Carolina) for the first time in the show's history. On January 18, 2014, College GameDay opened its tenth season with another men's doubleheader, this time, at The Palestra in Philadelphia, Pennsylvania, and at Gampel Pavilion.

For the 2013 and 2014 seasons, the intro for College GameDay was Macklemore's 2013 hit, Can't Hold Us.

On April 7, 2014, longtime analyst Digger Phelps announced his retirement and would not return for the 2015 season. That summer, Jalen Rose announced he would not return due to his priorities with NBA Countdown. As a result of the two departures, ESPN announced that Seth Greenberg and Jay Williams would be analysts for 2015 and beyond.

On September 30, 2014, ESPN announced that College GameDay would no longer have a set schedule, just like the football version of the show. Instead, the location will be chosen the week before to give the network a better opportunity to pick games with ranked teams and interesting story lines.

On October 8, 2019, Jay Williams replaced Paul Pierce as an analyst on NBA Countdown, and left College GameDay. LaPhonso Ellis was announced as his replacement.

On January 10, 2023, ESPN announced it would be adding three women's college basketball shows in one season, equaling the total number of women's games they had done in the show's history, bringing the overall total for women's games to six. Also since the first time since 2008, ESPN returned to the Final Four in Houston for both the Semifinal & Championship game.

LaPhonso Ellis was part of significant ESPN layoffs, ending his three-year run on the show. It was also announced the Jay Williams would be returning to the show.

In the UK, College GameDay was shown in full during BT Sport's decade on air (2013–2023), unless live sport was being aired on all of its channels. In July 2023, BT Sport was relaunched as TNT Sports following the sale of BT Sport to Warner Bros. Discovery EMEA. This saw the cessation of ESPN studio programming and therefore College GameDay is no longer shown in the UK. The football version of the show returned in November following an agreement between Sky Sports and ESPN which sees Sky Sports broadcasting three NCAA basketball games each week plus March Madness. However, Sky Sports has not shown GameDay.

== Personalities ==
=== Current ===
- Rece Davis: (Host, 2005–present)
- Christine Williamson: (Men's Reporter, 2024; Women's Host, 2025–present))
- Jay Bilas: (Analyst, 2005–present)
- Seth Greenberg: (Analyst, 2015–present)
- Rebecca Lobo: (Women's Analyst, 2022–present)
- Carolyn Peck: (Women's Analyst, 2022–present)
- Andraya Carter: (Women's Analyst, 2022–present; Men's Analyst, 2024–present)
- Holly Rowe: (Women's Reporter, 2022–present)
- Jay Williams: (Analyst, 2015–2019, 2024–present)
- Chiney Ogwumike: (Women's Analyst, 2024–present)
- Pete Thamel: (Men's Reporter, 2025–present)

=== Former ===
- Chris Fowler: (Host, 2005)
- Hubert Davis: (Analyst, 2007–2012)
- Bob Knight: (Analyst, 2008–2012)
- Digger Phelps: (Analyst, 2005–2014)
- Jalen Rose: (Analyst, 2013–2014)
- Andy Katz: (Reporter, 2005–2017)
- LaPhonso Ellis: (Analyst, 2020–2023)
- Elle Duncan: (Women's Host, 2022–2025)

== Locations ==
Since the program was launched in 2005, the show has been on the road. However, all shows in 2021 were broadcast from ESPN's headquarters in Bristol, Connecticut due to the COVID-19 pandemic.

== Appearances by school ==
Announced and visited locations as of April 6, 2026. All schools are listed with their current athletic brand names and conference affiliations, which do not necessarily match those of a given school during its last GameDay appearance.

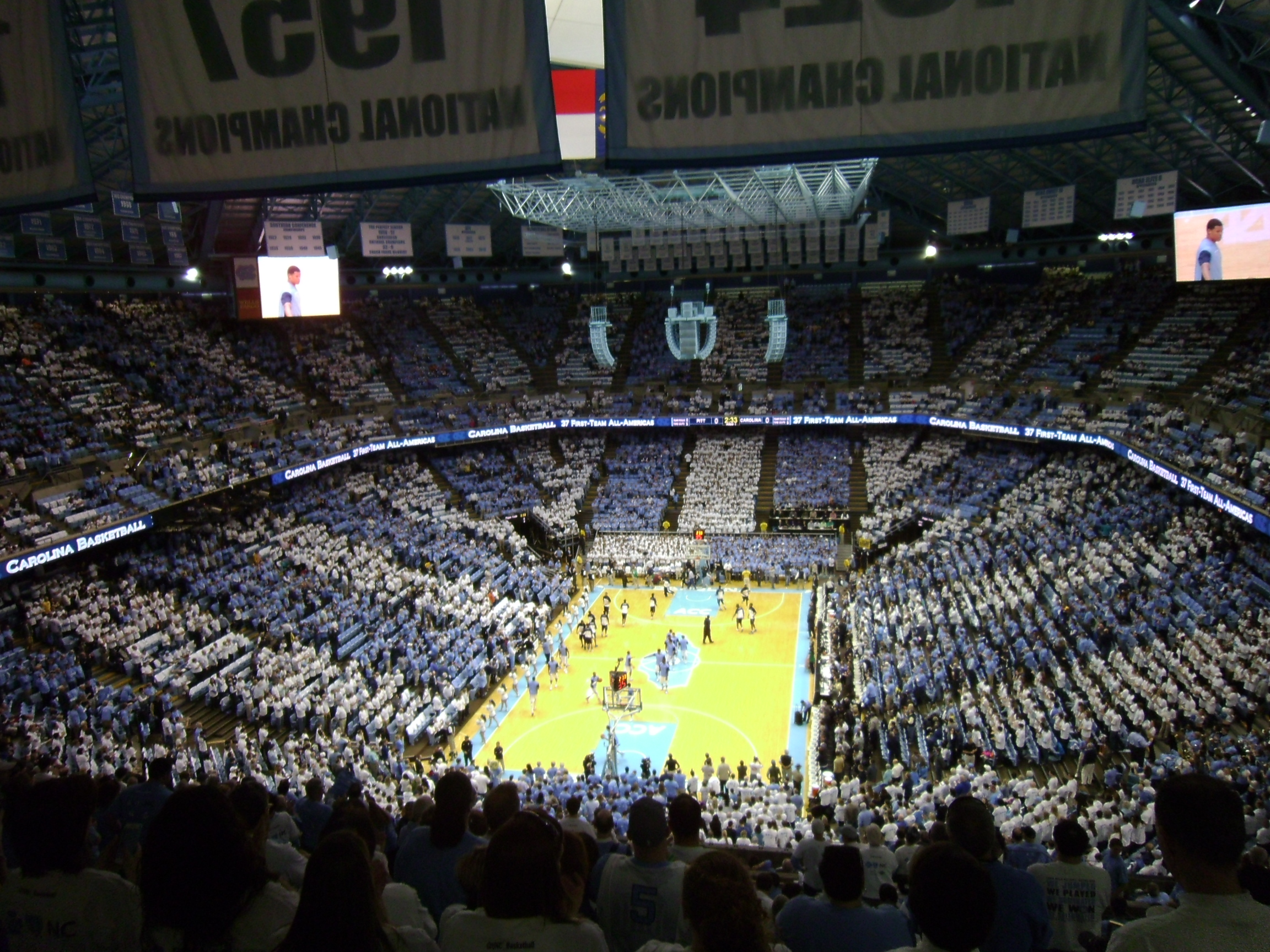
The Duke Blue Devils have been featured on GameDay a record 37 times, while North Carolina Tar Heels has been featured 34 times. Duke & North Carolina has hosted 16 times each. The Carolina–Duke rivalry has been the most frequent matchup featured 24 times, with the series tied 12–12.

=== Men ===
| School | Conference | Appearances | Hosted | Record | Win % | Last Hosted |
|---|---|---|---|---|---|---|
| Duke | ACC | 37 | 16 | 20–17 | .541 | March 7, 2026 |
| North Carolina | ACC | 34 | 16 | 18–16 | .529 | February 7, 2026 |
| Kansas | Big 12 | 28 | 13 | 19–9 | .679 | January 31, 2026 |
| Kentucky | SEC | 23 | 9 | 11–12 | .478 | February 16, 2019 |
| Florida | SEC | 16 | 6 | 14–2 | .875 | February 28, 2026 |
| UConn | Big East | 12 | 3 | 6–6 | .500 | February 24, 2024 |
| Michigan State | Big Ten | 11 | 5 | 5–6 | .455 | February 15, 2020 |
| Texas | SEC | 11 | 3 | 6–5 | .545 | February 3, 2018 |
| Arizona | Big 12 | 10 | 4 | 4–6 | .444 | February 14, 2026 |
| Tennessee | SEC | 10 | 2 | 6–4 | .600 | January 28, 2023 |
| Louisville | ACC | 9 | 2 | 6–3 | .667 | February 9, 2008 |
| Auburn | SEC | 8 | 5 | 4–4 | .500 | January 25, 2025 |
| Michigan | Big Ten | 7 | 2 | 4–3 | .571 | January 24, 2015 |
| UCLA | Big Ten | 7 | 2 | 4–3 | .571 | March 2, 2013 |
| Gonzaga | WCC | 6 | 3 | 3–3 | .500 | February 25, 2023 |
| Houston | Big 12 | 6 | 2 | 2–4 | .333 | February 22, 2025 |
| Memphis | American | 6 | 3 | 3–3 | .500 | February 8, 2014 |
| Syracuse | ACC | 6 | 4 | 5–1 | .833 | February 1, 2014 |
| Virginia | ACC | 6 | 4 | 1–5 | .167 | February 9, 2019 |
| Baylor | Big 12 | 5 | 3 | 1–4 | .200 | February 26, 2022 |
| Pittsburgh | ACC | 5 | 2 | 3–2 | .600 | January 21, 2012 |
| Texas A&M | SEC | 5 | 1 | 2–3 | .400 | February 20, 2016 |
| Alabama | SEC | 4 | 2 | 1–3 | .250 | February 15, 2025 |
| Maryland | Big Ten | 4 | 2 | 2–2 | .500 | February 29, 2020 |
| Notre Dame | ACC | 4 | 3 | 2–2 | .500 | February 6, 2016 |
| Oklahoma | SEC | 4 | 2 | 1–3 | .250 | February 13, 2016 |
| Georgetown | Big East | 3 | 1 | 1–2 | .333 | March 9, 2013 |
| Illinois | Big Ten | 3 | 1 | 1–2 | .333 | February 6, 2010 |
| Indiana | Big Ten | 3 | 1 | 2–1 | .667 | February 2, 2013 |
| Iowa State | Big 12 | 3 | 2 | 2–1 | .667 | February 8, 2025 |
| Kansas State | Big 12 | 3 | 1 | 0–3 | .000 | January 30, 2010 |
| Miami (FL) | ACC | 3 | 0 | 0–3 | .000 | Never |
| Ohio State | Big Ten | 3 | 1 | 1–2 | .333 | January 27, 2007 |
| Texas Tech | Big 12 | 3 | 2 | 2–1 | .667 | January 24, 2026 |
| Villanova | Big East | 3 | 1 | 0–3 | .000 | February 12, 2011 |
| West Virginia | Big 12 | 3 | 2 | 0–3 | .000 | January 27, 2018 |
| Arkansas | SEC | 2 | 1 | 0–2 | .000 | January 27, 2024 |
| Georgia Tech | ACC | 2 | 0 | 1–1 | .500 | Never |
| Missouri | SEC | 2 | 1 | 1–1 | .500 | February 4, 2012 |
| NC State | ACC | 2 | 1 | 1–1 | .500 | January 26, 2013 |
| Oklahoma State | Big 12 | 2 | 2 | 1–1 | .500 | March 1, 2014 |
| Saint Mary's | WCC | 2 | 1 | 0–2 | .000 | February 11, 2017 |
| San Diego State | Mountain West | 2 | 0 | 1–1 | .500 | Never |
| Vanderbilt | SEC | 2 | 1 | 0–2 | .000 | February 11, 2012 |
| Virginia Tech | ACC | 2 | 1 | 2–0 | 1.000 | February 10, 2018 |
| Washington | Big Ten | 2 | 1 | 2–0 | 1.000 | February 20, 2010 |
| Wisconsin | Big Ten | 2 | 1 | 2–0 | 1.000 | February 14, 2009 |
| Boston College | ACC | 1 | 1 | 0–1 | .000 | February 17, 2007 |
| Butler | Big East | 1 | 1 | 1–0 | 1.000 | January 9, 2013 |
| BYU | Big 12 | 1 | 0 | 1–0 | 1.000 | Never |
| California | ACC | 1 | 1 | 0–1 | .000 | February 28, 2009 |
| Clemson | ACC | 1 | 1 | 0–1 | .000 | January 23, 2010 |
| Colorado | Big 12 | 1 | 1 | 0–1 | .000 | February 22, 2014 |
| Creighton | Big East | 1 | 0 | 0–1 | .000 | Never |
| Dayton | A-10 | 1 | 1 | 1–0 | 1.000 | March 7, 2020 |
| Florida Atlantic | American | 1 | 0 | 0–1 | .000 | Never |
| Florida State | ACC | 1 | 1 | 1–0 | 1.000 | January 14, 2012 |
| George Washington | A-10 | 1 | 0 | 0–1 | .000 | Never |
| La Salle | A-10 | 1 | 1 | 1–0 | 1.000 | January 18, 2014 |
| LSU | SEC | 1 | 1 | 1–0 | 1.000 | January 6, 2007 |
| Marquette | Big East | 1 | 1 | 1–0 | 1.000 | March 3, 2007 |
| Mississippi State | SEC | 1 | 0 | 0–1 | .000 | Never |
| Nebraska | Big Ten | 1 | 0 | 0–1 | .000 | Never |
| Northern Iowa | Missouri Valley | 1 | 0 | 0–1 | .000 | Never |
| Oregon | Big Ten | 1 | 0 | 0–1 | .000 | Never |
| Purdue | Big Ten | 1 | 1 | 1–0 | 1.000 | January 22, 2011 |
| SMU | ACC | 1 | 1 | 1–0 | 1.000 | February 14, 2015 |
| Southern Illinois | Missouri Valley | 1 | 1 | 1–0 | 1.000 | January 26, 2008 |
| Stanford | ACC | 1 | 0 | 0–1 | .000 | Never |
| TCU | Big 12 | 1 | 0 | 0–1 | .000 | Never |
| Temple | American | 1 | 0 | 0–1 | .000 | Never |
| UCF | Big 12 | 1 | 0 | 1–0 | 1.000 | Never |
| Wichita State | American | 1 | 1 | 1–0 | 1.000 | February 28, 2015 |

=== Women ===
| School | Conference | Appearances | Hosted | Record | Win % | Last Hosted |
|---|---|---|---|---|---|---|
| South Carolina | SEC | 9 | 4 | 7–2 | .778 | February 22, 2026 |
| Notre Dame | ACC | 4 | 1 | 2–2 | .500 | March 2, 2025 |
| Tennessee | SEC | 3 | 2 | 1–2 | .333 | January 26, 2023 |
| UConn | Big East | 3 | 1 | 3–0 | 1.000 | January 16, 2010 |
| Texas | SEC | 3 | 1 | 2–1 | .667 | February 1, 2026 |
| Iowa | Big Ten | 2 | 2 | 2–0 | 1.000 | March 3, 2024 |
| LSU | SEC | 2 | 2 | 0–2 | .000 | February 14, 2026 |
| NC State | ACC | 2 | 1 | 1–1 | .500 | February 23, 2025 |
| Baylor | Big 12 | 1 | 0 | 0–1 | .000 | Never |
| Georgia | SEC | 1 | 0 | 0–1 | .000 | Never |
| Indiana | Big Ten | 1 | 0 | 0–1 | .000 | Never |
| Louisville | ACC | 1 | 0 | 0–1 | .000 | Never |
| North Carolina | ACC | 1 | 0 | 1–0 | 1.000 | Never |
| Ohio State | Big Ten | 1 | 0 | 0–1 | .000 | Never |
| Oklahoma | SEC | 1 | 0 | 0–1 | .000 | Never |
| Ole Miss | SEC | 1 | 0 | 0–1 | .000 | Never |
| TCU | Big 12 | 1 | 1 | 1–0 | 1.000 | March 1, 2026 |
| Vanderbilt | SEC | 1 | 0 | 0–1 | .000 | Never |
| Virginia Tech | ACC | 1 | 1 | 0–1 | .000 | February 25, 2024 |

== Frequent Matchups ==
College GameDay has attended several particular matchups with regularity.

=== Men ===
| Team 1 | Team 2 | Matchups | Record | Last Appearance | Last Result |
|---|---|---|---|---|---|
| Duke | North Carolina | 24 | Tied 12–12 | March 7, 2026 | Duke 76–61 |
| Florida | Kentucky | 8 | Florida 7−1 | January 20, 2018 | Florida 66–64 |
| Arizona | UCLA | 4 | UCLA 3−1 | February 25, 2017 | UCLA 77–72 |
| Baylor | Kansas | 4 | Kansas 3−1 | February 10, 2024 | Kansas 64–61 |
| Kansas | Kentucky | 4 | Tied 2−2 | January 29, 2022 | Kentucky 80–62 |
| Kansas | Texas | 4 | Kansas 3−1 | February 28, 2015 | Kansas 69–64 |
| Duke | Virginia | 3 | Duke 3−0 | February 9, 2019 | Duke 81–71 |
| Kansas | Kansas State | 3 | Kansas 3−0 | January 29, 2011 | Kansas 90–66 |
| Maryland | Michigan State | 3 | Michigan State 2–1 | February 29, 2020 | Michigan State 78–66 |
| Oklahoma | Texas | 3 | Texas 2−1 | February 3, 2018 | Texas 79–74 |

=== Women ===
| Team 1 | Team 2 | Matchups | Record | Last Appearance | Last Result |
|---|---|---|---|---|---|
| South Carolina | Texas | 2 | Tied 1−1 | March 8, 2026 | Texas 78–61 |
| South Carolina | LSU | 2 | South Carolina 2−0 | February 14, 2026 | South Carolina 79–72 |
| Notre Dame | NC State | 2 | Tied 1−1 | February 23, 2025 | NC State 104–95 ^{2OT} |
| South Carolina | Tennessee | 2 | South Carolina 2−0 | March 5, 2023 | South Carolina 74–58 |

== AP Top 5 vs Top 5 ==
=== Men ===
| | Date | Winning Team | Losing Team | Result | Significance |
|---|---|---|---|---|---|
| 1 | April 2, 2007 | No. 3 Florida | No. 1 Ohio State | 84−75 | 2007 National Title Game |
| 2 | February 23, 2008 | No. 2 Tennessee | No. 1 Memphis | 66−62 | – |
| 3 | April 5, 2008 | No. 2 Memphis | No. 3 UCLA | 78−63 | 2008 Final Four |
| 4 | April 5, 2008 | No. 4 Kansas | No. 1 North Carolina | 84−66 | 2008 Final Four |
| 5 | April 7, 2008 | No. 4 Kansas | No. 2 Memphis | 75−68^{OT} | 2008 National Title Game |
| 6 | February 2, 2013 | No. 3 Indiana | No. 1 Michigan | 81−73 | – |
| 7 | January 31, 2015 | No. 4 Duke | No. 2 Virginia | 69−63 | – |
| 8 | January 28, 2017 | No. 2 Kansas | No. 4 Kentucky | 79−73 | Big 12/SEC Challenge |
| 9 | February 25, 2017 | No. 5 UCLA | No. 4 Arizona | 77−72 | Rivalry |
| 10 | November 6, 2018 | No. 4 Duke | No. 2 Kentucky | 118−84 | Champions Classic |
| 11 | January 19, 2019 | No. 1 Duke | No. 4 Virginia | 72−70 | – |
| 12 | February 9, 2019 | No. 2 Duke | No. 3 Virginia | 81−71 | – |
| 13 | February 16, 2019 | No. 5 Kentucky | No. 1 Tennessee | 86−69 | Rivalry |
| 14 | March 9, 2019 | No. 3 North Carolina | No. 4 Duke | 79−70 | Rivalry |
| 15 | November 5, 2019 | No. 4 Duke | No. 3 Kansas | 68−66 | Champions Classic |
| 16 | November 5, 2019 | No. 2 Kentucky | No. 1 Michigan State | 69−62 | Champions Classic |
| 17 | February 22, 2020 | No. 3 Kansas | No. 1 Baylor | 64−61 | – |
| 18 | April 8, 2024 | No. 1 UConn | No. 3 Purdue | 75–60 | 2024 National Title Game |
| 19 | February 15, 2025 | No. 1 Auburn | No. 2 Alabama | 94−85 | Rivalry |
| 20 | March 15, 2025 | No. 4 Florida | No. 5 Alabama | 104−82 | 2025 SEC Tournament |
| 21 | April 5, 2025 | No. 3 Florida | No. 4 Auburn | 79–73 | 2025 Final Four |
| 22 | April 5, 2025 | No. 2 Houston | No. 1 Duke | 70–67 | 2025 Final Four |
| 23 | April 7, 2025 | No. 3 Florida | No. 2 Houston | 65–63 | 2025 National Title Game |
| 24 | February 21, 2026 | No. 3 Duke | No. 1 Michigan | 68–63 | Rivalry/Capital Showcase |
| 25 | March 14, 2026 | No. 2 Arizona | No. 5 Houston | 79–74 | 2026 Big 12 Tournament |
| 26 | April 4, 2026 | No. 3 Michigan | No. 2 Arizona | 91–73 | 2026 Final Four |

=== Women ===
| | Date | Winning Team | Losing Team | Result | Significance |
|---|---|---|---|---|---|
| 1 | January 16, 2010 | No. 1 UConn | No. 3 Notre Dame | 70−46 | Rivalry |
| 2 | March 9, 2025 | No. 5 South Carolina | No. 1 Texas | 64−45 | 2025 SEC Tournament |
| 3 | March 8, 2026 | No. 4 Texas | No. 3 South Carolina | 78−61 | 2026 SEC Tournament |

== International broadcasts ==
In the UK, College GameDay was shown in full during BT Sport's decade on air (2013–2023), unless live sport was being aired on all of its channels. In July 2023, BT Sport was relaunched as TNT Sports following the sale of BT Sport to Warner Bros. Discovery EMEA. ESPN programming did not transfer to TNT Sports, and College GameDay stopped being shown at this point.

In November 2023, following an agreement between Sky Sports and ESPN, College Basketball returned to UK screens, but in a much diminished form with three games shown each week, and this deal did not see the return of College GameDay to UK television screens.

== See also ==
- Big Monday
- Super Tuesday
- Wednesday Night Hoops
- Thursday Night Showcase
- Saturday Primetime
- Championship Week
