= List of NCAA Division I men's basketball conference tournament champions =

The following is a list of NCAA Division I men's basketball conference tournament champions.

== 1924 ==
Colorado d. Washington 2–0 in a best of three series - Pacific Coast.

BYU d. Colorado College 2–1 in a best of three series - Rocky Mountain.

North Carolina d. Alabama 26–18 - Southern.

== 1925 ==
Conference	Winning School	Regular season champion	NCAA Tournament Bid	Losing School	Regular season champion	NCAA Tournament Bid
Southern	North Carolina	RS		Tulane		

== 1926 ==
Conference	Winning School	Regular season champion	NCAA Tournament Bid	Losing School	Regular season champion	NCAA Tournament Bid
Southern	North Carolina			Mississippi State		

== 1927 ==
Conference	Winning School	Regular season champion	NCAA Tournament Bid	Losing School	Regular season champion	NCAA Tournament Bid
Southern	Vanderbilt			Georgia		

== 1928 ==
Conference	Winning School	Regular season champion	NCAA Tournament Bid	Losing School	Regular season champion	NCAA Tournament Bid
Southern	Mississippi			Auburn	RS	

== 1929 ==
Conference	Winning School	Regular season champion	NCAA Tournament Bid	Losing School	Regular season champion	NCAA Tournament Bid
Southern	North Carolina State			Duke		

== 1930 ==
Conference	Winning School	Regular season champion	NCAA Tournament Bid	Losing School	Regular season champion	NCAA Tournament Bid
Southern	Alabama	RS		Duke		

== 1931 ==
Conference	Winning School	Regular season champion	NCAA Tournament Bid	Losing School	Regular season champion	NCAA Tournament Bid
Southern	Maryland			Kentucky		

== 1932 ==
Conference	Winning School	Regular season champion	NCAA Tournament Bid	Losing School	Regular season champion	NCAA Tournament Bid
Southern	Georgia			North Carolina		

== 1933 ==
Conference	Winning School	Regular season champion	NCAA Tournament Bid	Losing School	Regular season champion	NCAA Tournament Bid
Southeastern	Kentucky	RS		Mississippi State		
Southern	South Carolina	RS		Duke		

== 1934 ==
Conference	Winning School	Regular season champion	NCAA Tournament Bid	Losing School	Regular season champion	NCAA Tournament Bid
Southeastern	Alabama	RS		Florida		
Southern	Washington & Lee			Duke		

== 1935 ==
Conference	Winning School	Regular season champion	NCAA Tournament Bid	Losing School	Regular season champion	NCAA Tournament Bid
Southern	North Carolina	RS		Washington & Lee		

== 1936 ==
Conference	Winning School	Regular season champion	NCAA Tournament Bid	Losing School	Regular season champion	NCAA Tournament Bid
Southeastern	Tennessee	RS		Alabama		
Southern	North Carolina			Washington & Lee	RS	

== 1937 ==
Conference	Winning School	Regular season champion	NCAA Tournament Bid	Losing School	Regular season champion	NCAA Tournament Bid
Southeastern	Kentucky	RS		Tennessee		
Southern	Washington & Lee	RS		North Carolina		

== 1938 ==
Conference	Winning School	Regular season champion	NCAA Tournament Bid	Losing School	Regular season champion	NCAA Tournament Bid
Southeastern	Georgia Tech	RS		Mississippi		
Southern	Duke			Clemson		

== 1939 ==
Conference	Winning School	Regular season champion	NCAA Tournament Bid	Losing School	Regular season champion	NCAA Tournament Bid
Southeastern	Kentucky	RS		Tennessee		
Southern	Clemson			Maryland		

== 1940 ==
Conference	Winning School	Regular season champion	NCAA Tournament Bid	Losing School	Regular season champion	NCAA Tournament Bid
Southeastern	Kentucky	RS		Georgia		
Southern	North Carolina			Duke	RS	

== 1941 ==
Conference	Winning School	Regular season champion	NCAA Tournament Bid	Losing School	Regular season champion	NCAA Tournament Bid
Southeastern	Tennessee	RS		Kentucky		
Southern	Duke			South Carolina		

== 1942 ==
Conference	Winning School	Regular season champion	NCAA Tournament Bid	Losing School	Regular season champion	NCAA Tournament Bid
Southeastern	Kentucky	RS	NCAA	Alabama		
Southern	Duke	RS		North Carolina State		

== 1943 ==
Conference	Winning School	Regular season champion	NCAA Tournament Bid	Losing School	Regular season champion	NCAA Tournament Bid
Southeastern	Tennessee	RS		Kentucky		
Southern	George Washington			Duke	RS	

== 1944 ==
Conference	Winning School	Regular season champion	NCAA Tournament Bid	Losing School	Regular season champion	NCAA Tournament Bid
Southeastern	Kentucky	RS		Tulane		
Southern	Duke			North Carolina	RS	

== 1945 ==
Conference	Winning School	Regular season champion	NCAA Tournament Bid	Losing School	Regular season champion	NCAA Tournament Bid
Southeastern	Kentucky	RS	NCAA	Tennessee		
Southern	North Carolina			Duke		

== 1946 ==
Conference	Winning School	Regular season champion	NCAA Tournament Bid	Losing School	Regular season champion	NCAA Tournament Bid
Southeastern	Kentucky	RS		LSU		
Southern	Duke			Wake Forest		

== 1947 ==
Conference	Winning School	Regular season champion	NCAA Tournament Bid	Losing School	Regular season champion	NCAA Tournament Bid
Southeastern	Kentucky	RS		Tulane		
Southern	North Carolina State	RS		North Carolina		

== 1948 ==
Conference	Winning School	Regular season champion	NCAA Tournament Bid	Losing School	Regular season champion	NCAA Tournament Bid
Southeastern	Kentucky	RS	NCAA	Georgia Tech		
Southern	North Carolina State	RS		Duke		

== 1949 ==
Conference	Winning School	Regular season champion	NCAA Tournament Bid	Losing School	Regular season champion	NCAA Tournament Bid
Ohio Valley	Western Kentucky State	RS		Louisville		
Southeastern	Kentucky	RS	NCAA	Tulane		
Southern	North Carolina State	RS		George Washington		

== 1950 ==
Conference	Winning School	Regular season champion	NCAA Tournament Bid	Losing School	Regular season champion	NCAA Tournament Bid
Ohio Valley	Eastern Kentucky			Western Kentucky State	RS	
Southeastern	Kentucky	RS		Tennessee		
Southern	North Carolina State	RS	NCAA	Duke		

== 1951 ==
Conference	Winning School	Regular season champion	NCAA Tournament Bid	Losing School	Regular season champion	NCAA Tournament Bid
Ohio Valley	Murray State	RS		Eastern Kentucky		
Southeastern	Vanderbilt			Kentucky	RS	NCAA
Southern	North Carolina State	RS	NCAA	Duke		

== 1952 ==
Conference	Winning School	Regular season champion	NCAA Tournament Bid	Losing School	Regular season champion	NCAA Tournament Bid
Ohio Valley	Western Kentucky State			Murray State		
Southeastern	Kentucky	RS	NCAA	LSU		
Southern	North Carolina State		NCAA	Duke		

== 1953 ==
Conference	Winning School	Regular season champion	NCAA Tournament Bid	Losing School	Regular season champion	NCAA Tournament Bid
Ohio Valley	Western Kentucky State			Eastern Kentucky	RS	NCAA
Southern	Wake Forest		NCAA	North Carolina State	RS	

== 1954 ==
Conference	Winning School	Regular season champion	NCAA Tournament Bid	Losing School	Regular season champion	NCAA Tournament Bid
Atlantic Coast	North Carolina State		NCAA	Wake Forest		
Ohio Valley	Western Kentucky State	RS		Eastern Kentucky		
Southern	George Washington	RS	NCAA	Richmond		

== 1955 ==
Conference	Winning School	Regular season champion	NCAA Tournament Bid	Losing School	Regular season champion	NCAA Tournament Bid
Atlantic Coast	North Carolina State	RS		Duke		NCAA
Ohio Valley	Eastern Kentucky			Murray State		
Southern	West Virginia	RS	NCAA	George Washington		

== 1956 ==
Conference	Winning School	Regular season champion	NCAA Tournament Bid	Losing School	Regular season champion	NCAA Tournament Bid
Atlantic Coast	North Carolina State	RS	NCAA	Wake Forest		
Southern	West Virginia	RS	NCAA	Richmond		

== 1957 ==
Conference	Winning School	Regular season champion	NCAA Tournament Bid	Losing School	Regular season champion	NCAA Tournament Bid
Atlantic Coast	North Carolina	RS	NCAA	South Carolina		
Southern	West Virginia	RS	NCAA	Washington & Lee		

== 1958 ==
Conference	Winning School	Regular season champion	NCAA Tournament Bid	Losing School	Regular season champion	NCAA Tournament Bid
Atlantic Coast	Maryland		NCAA	North Carolina		
Southern	West Virginia	RS	NCAA	William & Mary		

== 1959 ==
Conference	Winning School	Regular season champion	NCAA Tournament Bid	Losing School	Regular season champion	NCAA Tournament Bid
Atlantic Coast	North Carolina State	RS		North Carolina	RS	NCAA
Ivy League Playoff	Dartmouth	RS	NCAA	Princeton	RS	
Southern	West Virginia	RS	NCAA	Citadel		

== 1960 ==
Conference	Winning School	Regular season champion	NCAA Tournament Bid	Losing School	Regular season champion	NCAA Tournament Bid
Atlantic Coast	Duke		NCAA	Wake Forest		
Southern	West Virginia		NCAA	Virginia Tech	RS	

== 1961 ==
Conference	Winning School	Regular season champion	NCAA Tournament Bid	Losing School	Regular season champion	NCAA Tournament Bid
Atlantic Coast	Wake Forest		NCAA	Duke		
Southern	George Washington		NCAA	William & Mary		

== 1962 ==
Conference	Winning School	Regular season champion	NCAA Tournament Bid	Losing School	Regular season champion	NCAA Tournament Bid
Atlantic Coast	Wake Forest	RS	NCAA	Clemson		
Southern	West Virginia	RS	NCAA	Virginia Tech		

== 1963 ==
Conference	Winning School	Regular season champion	NCAA Tournament Bid	Losing School	Regular season champion	NCAA Tournament Bid
Atlantic Coast	Duke	RS	NCAA	Wake Forest		
Ivy League Playoff	Princeton	RS	NCAA	Yale	RS	
Southern	West Virginia	RS	NCAA	Davidson		

== 1964 ==
Conference	Winning School	Regular season champion	NCAA Tournament Bid	Losing School	Regular season champion	NCAA Tournament Bid
Atlantic Coast	Duke	RS	NCAA	Wake Forest		
Ohio Valley	Murray State	RS	NCAA	Western Kentucky State		
Southern	VMI		NCAA	George Washington		

== 1965 ==
Conference	Winning School	Regular season champion	NCAA Tournament Bid	Losing School	Regular season champion	NCAA Tournament Bid
Atlantic Coast	North Carolina State		NCAA	Duke	RS	
Ohio Valley	Western Kentucky State			Eastern Kentucky	RS	NCAA
Southern	West Virginia		NCAA	William & Mary		

== 1966 ==
Conference	Winning School	Regular season champion	NCAA Tournament Bid	Losing School	Regular season champion	NCAA Tournament Bid
Atlantic Coast	Duke	RS	NCAA	North Carolina State		
Ohio Valley	WKU	RS	NCAA	East Tennessee State		
Southern	Davidson	RS	NCAA	West Virginia		

== 1967 ==
Conference	Winning School	Regular season champion	NCAA Tournament Bid	Losing School	Regular season champion	NCAA Tournament Bid
Atlantic Coast	North Carolina	RS	NCAA	Duke		
Ohio Valley	Tennessee Tech			Murray State		
Southern	West Virginia	RS	NCAA	Davidson		

== 1968 ==
Conference	Winning School	Regular season champion	NCAA Tournament Bid	Losing School	Regular season champion	NCAA Tournament Bid
Atlantic Coast	North Carolina	RS	NCAA	North Carolina State		
Ivy League Playoff	Columbia	RS	NCAA	Princeton	RS	
Southern	Davidson	RS	NCAA	West Virginia		

== 1969 ==
Conference	Winning School	Regular season champion	NCAA Tournament Bid	Losing School	Regular season champion	NCAA Tournament Bid
Atlantic Coast	North Carolina	RS	NCAA	Duke		
Southern	Davidson	RS	NCAA	East Carolina		

== 1970 ==
Conference	Winning School	Regular season champion	NCAA Tournament Bid	Losing School	Regular season champion	NCAA Tournament Bid
Atlantic Coast	North Carolina State		NCAA	South Carolina	RS	
Southern	Davidson	RS	NCAA	Richmond		

== 1971 ==
Conference	Winning School	Regular season champion	NCAA Tournament Bid	Losing School	Regular season champion	NCAA Tournament Bid
Atlantic Coast	South Carolina		NCAA	North Carolina	RS	
Southern	Furman		NCAA	Richmond		

== 1972 ==
Conference	Winning School	Regular season champion	NCAA Tournament Bid	Losing School	Regular season champion	NCAA Tournament Bid
Atlantic Coast	North Carolina	RS	NCAA	Maryland		
Mid-Eastern	North Carolina A&T	RS				
Southern	East Carolina		NCAA	Furman		

== 1973 ==
Conference	Winning School	Regular season champion	NCAA Tournament Bid	Losing School	Regular season champion	NCAA Tournament Bid
Atlantic Coast	North Carolina State	RS		Maryland		NCAA
Mid-Eastern	North Carolina A&T					
Southern	Furman		NCAA	Davidson	RS	

== 1974 ==
Conference	Winning School	Regular season champion	NCAA Tournament Bid	Losing School	Regular season champion	NCAA Tournament Bid
Atlantic Coast	North Carolina State	RS	NCAA	Maryland		
Mid-Eastern	MD-Eastern Shore	RS				
Southern	Furman	RS	NCAA	Richmond		

== 1975 ==
Conference	Winning School	Regular season champion	NCAA Tournament Bid	Losing School	Regular season champion	NCAA Tournament Bid
Atlantic Coast	North Carolina		NCAA	North Carolina State		
East Coast	La Salle	RS	NCAA	Lafayette	RS	
Mid-Eastern	North Carolina A&T	RS		Morgan State		
Ohio Valley	Middle Tennessee State	RS	NCAA	Austin Peay		
Southern	Furman	RS	NCAA	William & Mary		

== 1976 ==
Conference	Winning School	Regular season champion	NCAA Tournament Bid	Losing School	Regular season champion	NCAA Tournament Bid
Atlantic Coast	Virginia		NCAA	North Carolina	RS	NCAA
Big Sky	Boise State	RS	NCAA	Weber State	RS	
East Coast	Hofstra		NCAA	Temple		
Metro	Cincinnati		NCAA	Memphis State		NCAA
Mid-Eastern	North Carolina A&T	RS		MD-Eastern Shore		
Ohio Valley	WKU	RS	NCAA	Morehead State		
Pacific Coast	San Diego State		NCAA	Pacific		
Southern	VMI	RS	NCAA	Richmond		
Southwest	Texas Tech		NCAA	Texas A&M	RS	

== 1977 ==
Conference	Winning School	Regular season champion	NCAA Tournament Bid	Losing School	Regular season champion	NCAA Tournament Bid
Atlantic Coast	North Carolina	RS	NCAA	Virginia		
Big Eight	Kansas State	RS	NCAA	Missouri		
Big Sky	Idaho State	RS	NCAA	Weber State		
East Coast	Hofstra	RS	NCAA	La Salle		
Eastern 8	Duquesne		NCAA	Villanova		
Metro	Cincinnati		NCAA	Georgia Tech		
MEAC	Morgan State					
Missouri Valley	Southern Illinois	RS	NCAA	West Texas State		
Ohio Valley	Middle Tennessee State		NCAA	Austin Peay	RS	
Pacific Coast	Long Beach State	RS	NCAA	San Jose State		
Southern	VMI	RS	NCAA	Appalachian State		
Southwest	Arkansas	RS	NCAA	Houston		
Sun Belt	UNC Charlotte	RS	NCAA	New Orleans		

== 1978 ==
Conference	Winning School	Regular season champion	NCAA Tournament Bid	Losing School	Regular season champion	NCAA Tournament Bid
Atlantic Coast	Duke		NCAA	Wake Forest		
Big Eight	Missouri		NCAA	Kansas State		
Big Sky	Weber State		NCAA	Montana	RS	
East Coast	La Salle	RS	NCAA	Temple		
Eastern 8	Villanova	RS	NCAA	West Virginia		
Metro	Louisville		NCAA	Florida State	RS	NCAA
MEAC	North Carolina A&T	RS				
Missouri Valley	Creighton	RS	NCAA	Indiana State		
Ohio Valley	WKU		NCAA	Austin Peay		
Pacific Coast	Cal State Fullerton		NCAA	Long Beach State		
Southern	Furman		NCAA	Marshall		
Southwest	Houston		NCAA	Texas	RS	
Sun Belt	New Orleans			South Alabama		

== 1979 ==
Conference	Winning School	Regular season champion	NCAA Tournament Bid	Losing School	Regular season champion	NCAA Tournament Bid
Atlantic Coast	North Carolina	RS	NCAA	Duke	RS	NCAA
Big Eight	Oklahoma	RS	NCAA	Kansas		
Big Sky	Weber State	RS	NCAA	Northern Arizona		
East Coast	Temple	RS	NCAA	St. Joseph's		
Eastern 8	Rutgers		NCAA	Pittsburgh		
Metro	Virginia Tech		NCAA	Florida State		
Mid-Eastern	North Carolina A&T	RS		Howard		
Missouri Valley	Indiana State	RS	NCAA	New Mexico State		NCAA
Ohio Valley	Eastern Kentucky	RS	NCAA	WKU		
Pacific Coast	Pacific	RS	NCAA	Utah State		NCAA
Southeastern	Tennessee		NCAA	Kentucky		
Southern	Appalachian State	RS	NCAA	Furman		
Southwest	Arkansas	RS	NCAA	Texas	RS	NCAA
Sun Belt	Jacksonville		NCAA	South Florida		
Trans America	Northeast Louisiana	RS		Mercer		

== 1980 ==
Conference	Winning School	Regular season champion	NCAA Tournament Bid	Losing School	Regular season champion	NCAA Tournament Bid
Atlantic Coast	Duke		NCAA	Maryland	RS	NCAA
Big East	Georgetown	RS	NCAA	Syracuse	RS	NCAA
Big Eight	Kansas State		NCAA	Kansas		
Big Sky	Weber State	RS	NCAA	Montana		
East Coast	La Salle		NCAA	St. Joseph's	RS	
Eastern 8	Villanova	RS	NCAA	West Virginia		
ECAC North	Holy Cross		NCAA	Boston University	RS	
Ivy League Playoff	Pennsylvania	RS	NCAA	Princeton	RS	
Metro	Louisville	RS	NCAA	Florida State		NCAA
Mid-American	Toledo	RS	NCAA	Bowling Green		
Mid-Eastern	Howard	RS				
Midwestern	Oral Roberts			Loyola-Chicago	RS	
Missouri Valley	Bradley	RS	NCAA	West Texas State		
Ohio Valley	WKU	RS	NCAA	Murray State	RS	
Pacific Coast	San Jose State		NCAA	Long Beach State		
Southeastern	LSU		NCAA	Kentucky	RS	NCAA
Southern	Furman	RS	NCAA	Marshall		
Southwest	Texas A&M	RS	NCAA	Texas		
Southwestern Athletic	Alcorn State	RS	NCAA	Grambling		
Sun Belt	Virginia Commonwealth		NCAA	UAB		
Trans America	Centenary			Northeast Louisiana	RS	

== 1981 ==
Conference	Winning School	Regular season champion	NCAA Tournament Bid	Losing School	Regular season champion	NCAA Tournament Bid
Atlantic Coast	North Carolina		NCAA	Maryland		NCAA
Big East	Syracuse			Villanova		NCAA
Big Eight	Kansas		NCAA	Kansas State		NCAA
Big Sky	Idaho	RS	NCAA	Montana		
East Coast	St. Joseph's		NCAA	American	RS	
Eastern 8	Pittsburgh		NCAA	Duquesne	RS	
ECAC North	Northeastern	RS	NCAA	Holy Cross		
Ivy League Playoff	Princeton	RS	NCAA	Pennsylvania	RS	
Metro	Louisville	RS	NCAA	Cincinnati		
Mid-American	Ball State	RS	NCAA	Northern Illinois	RS	
Mid-Eastern	Howard		NCAA	North Carolina A&T	RS	
Midwestern	Oklahoma City			Xavier	RS	
Missouri Valley	Creighton		NCAA	Wichita State	RS	NCAA
Ohio Valley	WKU	RS	NCAA	Murray State		
Pacific Coast	Fresno State	RS	NCAA	San Jose State		
Southeastern	Mississippi		NCAA	Georgia		
Southern	UT-Chattanooga	RS	NCAA	Appalachian State	RS	
Southland	Lamar	RS	NCAA	Louisiana Tech		
Southwest	Houston		NCAA	Texas		
Southwestern Athletic	Southern	RS	NCAA	Grambling		
Sun Belt	Virginia Commonwealth	RS	NCAA	UAB	RS	NCAA
Trans America	Mercer		NCAA	Houston Baptist	RS	

== 1982 ==
Conference	Winning School	Regular season champion	NCAA Tournament Bid	Losing School	Regular season champion	NCAA Tournament Bid
Atlantic Coast	North Carolina	RS	NCAA	Virginia	RS	NCAA
Big East	Georgetown		NCAA	Villanova	RS	NCAA
Big Eight	Missouri	RS	NCAA	Oklahoma		
Big Sky	Idaho	RS	NCAA	Nevada		
East Coast	St. Joseph's		NCAA	La Salle		
Eastern 8	Pittsburgh		NCAA	West Virginia	RS	NCAA
ECAC North	Northeastern	RS	NCAA	Niagara		
Metro	Memphis State	RS	NCAA	Louisville		NCAA
Metro Atlantic	Fordham			St. Peter's	RS	
Mid-American	Northern Illinois		NCAA	Ball State	RS	
Mid-Eastern	North Carolina A&T	RS	NCAA			
Midwestern	Evansville	RS	NCAA	Loyola-Chicago		
Missouri Valley	Tulsa		NCAA	Illinois State		
Northeast	Robert Morris	RS	NCAA	LIU-Brooklyn		
Ohio Valley	Middle Tennessee State		NCAA	WKU	RS	
Pacific Coast	Fresno State	RS	NCAA	CSU-Fullerton		
Southeastern	Alabama		NCAA	Kentucky	RS	NCAA
Southern	UT-Chattanooga	RS	NCAA	Davidson		
Southland	SW Louisiana	RS	NCAA	TX-Arlington		
Southwest	Arkansas	RS	NCAA	Houston		NCAA
Southwestern Athletic	Alcorn State	RS	NCAA	Jackson State	RS	
Sun Belt	UAB	RS	NCAA	Virginia Commonwealth		
Trans America	Northeast Louisiana		NCAA	Centenary		

== 1983 ==
Conference	Winning School	Regular season champion	NCAA Tournament Bid	Losing School	Regular season champion	NCAA Tournament Bid
Atlantic 10	West Virginia	RS	NCAA	Temple		
Atlantic Coast	North Carolina State		NCAA	Virginia	RS	NCAA
Big East	St. John's	RS	NCAA	Boston College	RS	NCAA
Big Eight	Oklahoma State		NCAA	Missouri	RS	NCAA
Big Sky	Weber State	RS	NCAA	Nevada	RS	
Colonial	James Madison		NCAA	William & Mary	RS	
East Coast	La Salle	RS	NCAA	American	RS	
ECAC North Atlantic	Boston University	RS	NCAA	Holy Cross		
Metro	Louisville	RS	NCAA	Tulane		
Metro Atlantic	Fordham			Iona	RS	
Mid-American	Ohio		NCAA	Bowling Green	RS	
Mid-Eastern	North Carolina A&T		NCAA			
Midwestern	Xavier		NCAA	Loyola-Chicago	RS	
Missouri Valley	Illinois State		NCAA	Tulsa		
Northeast	Robert Morris	RS	NCAA	LIU-Brooklyn	RS	
Ohio Valley	Morehead State		NCAA	Akron		
Pacific Coast	UNLV	RS	NCAA	Fresno State		
Southeastern	Georgia		NCAA	Alabama		NCAA
Southern	UT-Chattanooga	RS	NCAA	East Tennessee State		
Southland	Lamar	RS	NCAA	North Texas		
Southwest	Houston	RS	NCAA	TCU		
Southwestern Athletic	Alcorn State		NCAA	Texas Southern	RS	
Sun Belt	UAB		NCAA	South Florida		
Trans America	Georgia Southern		NCAA	AR-Little Rock	RS	

== 1984 ==
Conference	Winning School	Regular season champion	NCAA Tournament Bid	Losing School	Regular season champion	NCAA Tournament Bid
Atlantic 10	West Virginia		NCAA	St. Bonaventure		
Atlantic Coast	Maryland		NCAA	Duke		NCAA
Big East	Georgetown	RS	NCAA	Syracuse		NCAA
Big Eight	Kansas		NCAA	Oklahoma	RS	NCAA
Big Sky	Nevada		NCAA	Montana		
Colonial	Richmond	RS	NCAA	Navy		
East Coast	Rider		NCAA	Bucknell	RS	
ECAC North Atlantic	Northeastern	RS	NCAA	Canisius		
Metro	Memphis State	RS	NCAA	Virginia Tech		
Metro Atlantic	Iona	RS	NCAA	Fordham		
Mid-American	Miami (OH)	RS	NCAA	Kent State		
Mid-Continent	Western Illinois			Cleveland State		
Mid-Eastern	North Carolina A&T	RS	NCAA			
Midwestern	Oral Roberts	RS	NCAA	Xavier		
Missouri Valley	Tulsa	RS	NCAA	Creighton		
Northeast	LIU-Brooklyn	RS	NCAA	Robert Morris	RS	
Ohio Valley	Morehead State	RS	NCAA	Youngstown State		
Pacific Coast	Fresno State		NCAA	UNLV	RS	NCAA
Southeastern	Kentucky	RS	NCAA	Auburn		NCAA
Southern	Marshall	RS	NCAA	UT-Chattanooga		
Southland	Louisiana Tech		NCAA	Lamar	RS	
Southwest	Houston	RS	NCAA	Arkansas		NCAA
Southwestern Athletic	Alcorn State	RS	NCAA	Texas Southern		
Sun Belt	UAB		NCAA	Old Dominion		
Trans America	Houston Baptist	RS	NCAA	Samford		
Western Athletic	UTEP	RS	NCAA	New Mexico		

== 1985 ==
Conference	Winning School	Regular season champion	NCAA Tournament Bid	Losing School	Regular season champion	NCAA Tournament Bid
Atlantic 10	Temple		NCAA	Rutgers		
Atlantic Coast	Georgia Tech	RS	NCAA	North Carolina	RS	NCAA
Big East	Georgetown		NCAA	St. John's	RS	NCAA
Big Eight	Oklahoma	RS	NCAA	Iowa State		NCAA
Big Sky	Nevada	RS	NCAA	Idaho State		
Colonial	Navy	RS	NCAA	Richmond	RS	
East Coast	Lehigh		NCAA	Bucknell	RS	
ECAC North Atlantic	Northeastern	RS	NCAA	Boston University		
Metro	Memphis State	RS	NCAA	Florida State		
Metro Atlantic	Iona	RS	NCAA	Fordham		
Mid-American	Ohio	RS	NCAA	Miami (OH)		NCAA
Mid-Continent	Eastern Illinois			SW Missouri State		
Mid-Eastern	North Carolina A&T	RS	NCAA	Howard		
Midwestern	Loyola-Chicago	RS	NCAA	Oral Roberts		
Missouri Valley	Wichita State		NCAA	Tulsa	RS	NCAA
Northeast	Fairleigh Dickinson		NCAA	Loyola (MD)		
Ohio Valley	Middle Tennessee State		NCAA	Youngstown State		
Pacific Coast	UNLV	RS	NCAA	CSU-Fullerton		
Southeastern	Auburn		NCAA	Alabama		NCAA
Southern	Marshall		NCAA	VMI		
Southland	Louisiana Tech	RS	NCAA	Lamar		
Southwest	Texas Tech	RS	NCAA	SMU		NCAA
Southwestern Athletic	Southern		NCAA	Alcorn State	RS	
Sun Belt	Virginia Commonwealth	RS	NCAA	Old Dominion		NCAA
Trans America	Mercer		NCAA	AR-Little Rock		
Western Athletic	San Diego State		NCAA	UTEP	RS	NCAA

== 1986 ==
Conference	Winning School	Regular season champion	NCAA Tournament Bid	Losing School	Regular season champion	NCAA Tournament Bid
Atlantic 10	St. Joseph's	RS	NCAA	West Virginia		NCAA
Atlantic Coast	Duke	RS	NCAA	Georgia Tech		NCAA
Big East	St. John's	RS	NCAA	Syracuse	RS	NCAA
Big Eight	Kansas	RS	NCAA	Iowa State		NCAA
Big Sky	Montana State		NCAA	Montana	RS	
Big South	Charleston Southern	RS		Augusta State		
Colonial	Navy	RS	NCAA	George Mason		
East Coast	Drexel	RS	NCAA	Hofstra		
ECAC North Atlantic	Northeastern	RS	NCAA	Boston University		
Metro	Louisville	RS	NCAA	Memphis State		NCAA
Metro Atlantic	Fairfield	RS	NCAA	Holy Cross		
Mid-American	Ball State		NCAA	Miami (OH)	RS	NCAA
Mid-Continent	Cleveland State	RS	NCAA	Eastern Illinois		
Mid-Eastern	North Carolina A&T	RS	NCAA			
Midwestern	Xavier	RS	NCAA	Saint Louis		
Missouri Valley	Tulsa		NCAA	Bradley	RS	NCAA
Northeast	Marist		NCAA	Fairleigh Dickinson	RS	
Ohio Valley	Akron	RS	NCAA	Middle Tennessee State	RS	
Pacific Coast	UNLV	RS	NCAA	New Mexico State		
Southeastern	Kentucky	RS	NCAA	Alabama		NCAA
Southern	Davidson		NCAA	UT-Chattanooga	RS	
Southland	Northeast Louisiana	RS	NCAA	McNeese State		
Southwest	Texas Tech		NCAA	Texas A&M	RS	
Southwestern Athletic	Mississippi Valley State		NCAA			
Sun Belt	Jacksonville		NCAA	UAB		NCAA
Trans America	AR-Little Rock	RS	NCAA	Centenary		
Western Athletic	UTEP	RS	NCAA	Wyoming	RS	

== 1987 ==
Conference	Winning School	Regular season champion	NCAA Tournament Bid	Losing School	Regular season champion	NCAA Tournament Bid
Atlantic 10	Temple	RS	NCAA	West Virginia		NCAA
Atlantic Coast	North Carolina State		NCAA	North Carolina	RS	NCAA
Big East	Georgetown	RS	NCAA	Syracuse	RS	NCAA
Big Eight	Missouri	RS	NCAA	Kansas		NCAA
Big Sky	Idaho State		NCAA	Nevada		
Big South	Charleston Southern	RS		Campbell		
Colonial	Navy	RS	NCAA	NC-Wilmington		
East Coast	Bucknell	RS	NCAA	Towson		
ECAC North Atlantic	Northeastern	RS	NCAA	Boston University		
Metro	Memphis State			Louisville	RS	
Metro Atlantic	Fairfield		NCAA	Iona		
Mid-American	Central Michigan	RS	NCAA	Kent		
Mid-Continent	SW Missouri State	RS	NCAA	Cleveland State		
Mid-Eastern	North Carolina A&T		NCAA			
Midwestern	Xavier		NCAA	Saint Louis		
Missouri Valley	Wichita State		NCAA	Tulsa	RS	NCAA
Northeast	Marist	RS	NCAA	Fairleigh Dickinson		
Ohio Valley	Austin Peay		NCAA	Eastern Kentucky		
Pacific Coast	UNLV	RS	NCAA	San Jose State		
Pacific-10	UCLA	RS	NCAA	Washington		
Southeastern	Alabama	RS	NCAA	LSU		NCAA
Southern	Marshall	RS	NCAA	Davidson		
Southland	Louisiana Tech	RS	NCAA	Arkansas State		
Southwest	Texas A&M		NCAA	Baylor		
Southwestern Athletic	Southern		NCAA			
Sun Belt	UAB		NCAA	WKU	RS	NCAA
Trans America	Georgia Southern		NCAA	Stetson		
West Coast	Santa Clara		NCAA	Pepperdine		
Western Athletic	Wyoming		NCAA	New Mexico		

== 1988 ==
Conference	Winning School	Regular season champion	NCAA Tournament Bid	Losing School	Regular season champion	NCAA Tournament Bid
American South	Louisiana Tech	RS		New Orleans	RS	
Atlantic 10	Temple	RS	NCAA	Rhode Island		NCAA
Atlantic Coast	Duke		NCAA	North Carolina	RS	NCAA
Big East	Syracuse		NCAA	Villanova		NCAA
Big Eight	Oklahoma	RS	NCAA	Kansas State		NCAA
Big Sky	Boise State	RS	NCAA	Montana State		
Big South	Winthrop			Radford		
Colonial	Richmond	RS	NCAA	George Mason		
East Coast	Lehigh		NCAA	Towson		
ECAC North Atlantic	Boston University		NCAA	Niagara		
Metro	Louisville	RS	NCAA	Memphis State		NCAA
Metro Atlantic	La Salle	RS	NCAA	Fordham		
Mid-American	Eastern Michigan	RS	NCAA	Ohio		
Mid-Eastern	North Carolina A&T	RS	NCAA	Florida A&M		
Midwestern	Xavier	RS	NCAA	Detroit		
Missouri Valley	Bradley	RS	NCAA	Illinois State		
Northeast	Fairleigh Dickinson	RS	NCAA	Monmouth		
Ohio Valley	Murray State	RS	NCAA	Austin Peay		
Pacific Coast	Utah State		NCAA	UC Irvine		
Pacific-10	Arizona	RS	NCAA	Oregon State		NCAA
Southeastern	Kentucky	RS	NCAA	Georgia		
Southern	UT-Chattanooga		NCAA	VMI		
Southland	North Texas	RS	NCAA	Northeast Louisiana		
Southwest	SMU	RS	NCAA	Baylor		NCAA
Southwestern Athletic	Southern	RS	NCAA			
Sun Belt	UNC Charlotte	RS	NCAA	Virginia Commonwealth		
Trans America	TX-San Antonio		NCAA	Georgia Southern	RS	
West Coast	Loyola Marymount	RS	NCAA	Santa Clara		
Western Athletic	Wyoming		NCAA	UTEP		NCAA

== 1989 ==
Conference	Winning School	Regular season champion	NCAA Tournament Bid	Losing School	Regular season champion	NCAA Tournament Bid
American South	Louisiana Tech		NCAA	New Orleans	RS	
Atlantic 10	Rutgers		NCAA	Penn State		
Atlantic Coast	North Carolina		NCAA	Duke		NCAA
Big East	Georgetown	RS	NCAA	Syracuse		NCAA
Big Eight	Missouri		NCAA	Oklahoma	RS	NCAA
Big Sky	Idaho	RS	NCAA	Boise State	RS	
Big South	NC-Asheville			Campbell		
Big West	UNLV	RS	NCAA	New Mexico State		
Colonial	George Mason		NCAA	NC-Wilmington		
East Coast	Bucknell	RS	NCAA	Lafayette		
ECAC North Atlantic	Siena	RS	NCAA	Boston University		
Metro	Louisville		NCAA	Florida State	RS	NCAA
Metro Atlantic	La Salle	RS	NCAA	St. Peter's		
Mid-American	Ball State	RS	NCAA	Kent		
Mid-Continent	SW Missouri State	RS	NCAA	Illinois-Chicago		
Mid-Eastern	South Carolina State	RS	NCAA	Florida A&M		
Midwestern	Xavier		NCAA	Evansville	RS	NCAA
Missouri Valley	Creighton	RS	NCAA	Southern Illinois		
Northeast	Robert Morris	RS	NCAA	Fairleigh Dickinson		
Ohio Valley	Middle Tennessee State	RS	NCAA	Austin Peay		
Pacific-10	Arizona	RS	NCAA	Stanford		NCAA
Southeastern	Alabama		NCAA	Florida	RS	NCAA
Southern	East Tennessee State		NCAA	Marshall		
Southland	McNeese State		NCAA	North Texas	RS	
Southwest	Arkansas	RS	NCAA	Texas		NCAA
Southwestern Athletic	Southern	RS	NCAA			
Sun Belt	South Alabama	RS	NCAA	Jacksonville		
Trans America	AR-Little Rock		NCAA	Centenary		
West Coast	Loyola Marymount		NCAA	Santa Clara		
Western Athletic	UTEP		NCAA	Colorado State	RS	NCAA

== 1990 ==
Conference	Winning School	Regular season champion	NCAA Tournament Bid	Losing School	Regular season champion	NCAA Tournament Bid
American South	New Orleans	RS		TX-Pan American		
Atlantic 10	Temple	RS	NCAA	Massachusetts		
Atlantic Coast	Georgia Tech		NCAA	Virginia		NCAA
Big East	Connecticut	RS	NCAA	Syracuse	RS	NCAA
Big Eight	Oklahoma		NCAA	Colorado		
Big Sky	Idaho	RS	NCAA	Eastern Washington		
Big South	Coastal Carolina	RS		NC-Asheville		
Big West	UNLV	RS	NCAA	Long Beach State		
Colonial	Richmond		NCAA	James Madison	RS	
East Coast	Towson	RS	NCAA	Lehigh	RS	
Metro	Louisville	RS	NCAA	Southern Mississippi		NCAA
Metro Atlantic	La Salle	RS	NCAA	Fordham		
Mid-American	Ball State	RS	NCAA	Central Michigan		
Mid-Continent	Northern Iowa		NCAA	WI-Green Bay		
Mid-Eastern	Coppin State	RS	NCAA	North Carolina A&T		
Midwestern	Dayton		NCAA	Xavier	RS	NCAA
Missouri Valley	Illinois State		NCAA	Southern Illinois	RS	
North Atlantic	Boston University		NCAA	Vermont		
Northeast	Robert Morris	RS	NCAA	Monmouth		
Ohio Valley	Murray State	RS	NCAA	Eastern Kentucky		
Pacific-10	Arizona	RS	NCAA	UCLA		NCAA
Southeastern	Alabama		NCAA	Mississippi		
Southern	East Tennessee State	RS	NCAA	Appalachian State		
Southland	Northeast Louisiana	RS	NCAA	North Texas		
Southwest	Arkansas	RS	NCAA	Houston		NCAA
Southwestern Athletic	Texas Southern		NCAA			
Sun Belt	South Florida		NCAA	UNC Charlotte		
Trans America	AR-Little Rock		NCAA	Centenary	RS	
Western Athletic	UTEP		NCAA	Hawaii		

== 1991 ==
Conference	Winning School	Regular season champion	NCAA Tournament Bid	Losing School	Regular season champion	NCAA Tournament Bid
American South	Louisiana Tech		NCAA	New Orleans	RS	NCAA
Atlantic 10	Penn State		NCAA	George Washington		
Atlantic Coast	North Carolina		NCAA	Duke	RS	NCAA
Big East	Seton Hall		NCAA	Georgetown		NCAA
Big Eight	Missouri			Nebraska		NCAA
Big Sky	Montana	RS	NCAA	Idaho		
Big South	Coastal Carolina	RS	NCAA	Augusta State		
Big West	UNLV	RS	NCAA	Fresno State		
Colonial	Richmond		NCAA	George Mason		
East Coast	Towson	RS	NCAA	Rider		
Metro	Florida State		NCAA	Louisville		
Metro Atlantic	St. Peter's		NCAA	Iona		
Mid-American	Eastern Michigan	RS	NCAA	Toledo		
Mid-Continent	WI-Green Bay		NCAA	Northern Illinois	RS	NCAA
Mid-Eastern	Florida A&M			Delaware State		
Midwestern	Xavier	RS	NCAA	Saint Louis		
Missouri Valley	Creighton	RS	NCAA	SW Missouri State		
North Atlantic	Northeastern	RS	NCAA	Maine		
Northeast	St. Francis (PA)	RS	NCAA	Fairleigh Dickinson	RS	
Ohio Valley	Murray State	RS	NCAA	Middle Tennessee State		
Patriot	Fordham	RS		Holy Cross		
Southeastern	Alabama		NCAA	Tennessee		
Southern	East Tennessee State	RS	NCAA	Appalachian State		
Southland	Northeast Louisiana	RS	NCAA	TX-Arlington		
Southwest	Arkansas	RS	NCAA	Texas		NCAA
Southwestern Athletic	Jackson State	RS				
Sun Belt	South Alabama	RS	NCAA	Old Dominion		
Trans America	Georgia State		NCAA	AR-Little Rock		
West Coast	Pepperdine	RS	NCAA	St. Mary's (CA)		
Western Athletic	BYU		NCAA	Utah	RS	NCAA

== 1992 ==
Conference	Winning School	Regular season champion	NCAA Tournament Bid	Losing School	Regular season champion	NCAA Tournament Bid
Atlantic 10	Massachusetts	RS	NCAA	West Virginia		NCAA
Atlantic Coast	Duke	RS	NCAA	North Carolina		NCAA
Big East	Syracuse		NCAA	Georgetown	RS	NCAA
Big Eight	Kansas	RS	NCAA	Oklahoma State		NCAA
Big Sky	Montana	RS	NCAA	Nevada		
Big South	Campbell		NCAA	Charleston Southern		
Big West	New Mexico State		NCAA	Pacific		
Colonial	Old Dominion		NCAA	James Madison	RS	
East Coast	Towson			Rider		
Great Midwest	Cincinnati	RS	NCAA	Memphis State		NCAA
Metro	UNC Charlotte		NCAA	Tulane	RS	NCAA
Metro Atlantic	La Salle		NCAA	Manhattan	RS	
Mid-American	Miami (OH)	RS	NCAA	Ball State		
Mid-Continent	Eastern Illinois		NCAA	Illinois-Chicago		
Mid-Eastern	Howard	RS	NCAA	Florida A&M		
Midwestern	Evansville	RS	NCAA	Butler		
Missouri Valley	SW Missouri State		NCAA	Tulsa		
North Atlantic	Delaware	RS	NCAA	Drexel		
Northeast	Robert Morris	RS	NCAA	Marist		
Ohio Valley	Murray State	RS	NCAA	Eastern Kentucky		
Patriot	Fordham	RS	NCAA	Bucknell	RS	
Southeastern	Kentucky	RS	NCAA	Alabama		NCAA
Southern	East Tennessee State	RS	NCAA	UT-Chattanooga	RS	
Southland	Northeast Louisiana		NCAA	TX-San Antonio	RS	
Southwest	Houston	RS	NCAA	Texas	RS	NCAA
Southwestern Athletic	Mississippi Valley State	RS	NCAA			
Sun Belt	SW Louisiana	RS	NCAA	Louisiana Tech	RS	
Trans America	Georgia Southern	RS	NCAA	Georgia State		
West Coast	Pepperdine	RS	NCAA	Gonzaga		
Western Athletic	BYU	RS	NCAA	UTEP	RS	NCAA

== 1993 ==
Conference	Winning School	Regular season champion	NCAA Tournament Bid	Losing School	Regular season champion	NCAA Tournament Bid
Atlantic 10	Massachusetts	RS	NCAA	Temple		NCAA
Atlantic Coast	Georgia Tech		NCAA	North Carolina	RS	NCAA
Big East	Seton Hall	RS	NCAA	Syracuse		
Big Eight	Missouri		NCAA	Kansas State		NCAA
Big Sky	Boise State		NCAA	Idaho	RS	
Big South	Coastal Carolina		NCAA	Winthrop		
Big West	Long Beach State		NCAA	New Mexico State	RS	NCAA
Colonial	East Carolina		NCAA	James Madison	RS	
Great Midwest	Cincinnati	RS	NCAA	Memphis State		NCAA
Metro	Louisville	RS	NCAA	Virginia Commonwealth		
Metro Atlantic	Manhattan	RS	NCAA	Niagara		
Mid-American	Ball State	RS	NCAA	Western Michigan		
Mid-Continent	Wright State		NCAA	Illinois-Chicago		
Mid-Eastern	Coppin State	RS	NCAA	Delaware State		
Midwestern	Evansville	RS	NCAA	Xavier	RS	NCAA
Missouri Valley	Southern Illinois		NCAA	Illinois State	RS	
North Atlantic	Delaware		NCAA	Drexel	RS	
Northeast	Rider	RS	NCAA	Wagner		
Ohio Valley	Tennessee State	RS	NCAA	Murray State		
Patriot	Holy Cross		NCAA	Bucknell	RS	
Southeastern	Kentucky		NCAA	LSU		NCAA
Southern	UT-Chattanooga	RS	NCAA	East Tennessee State		
Southland	Northeast Louisiana	RS	NCAA	TX-San Antonio		
Southwest	Texas Tech		NCAA	Houston		
Southwestern Athletic	Southern		NCAA			
Sun Belt	WKU		NCAA	New Orleans	RS	NCAA
West Coast	Santa Clara		NCAA	Pepperdine	RS	
Western Athletic	New Mexico		NCAA	UTEP		

== 1994 ==
Conference	Winning School	Regular season champion	NCAA Tournament Bid	Losing School	Regular season champion	NCAA Tournament Bid
Atlantic 10	Massachusetts	RS	NCAA	Temple		NCAA
Atlantic Coast	North Carolina		NCAA	Virginia		NCAA
Big East	Providence		NCAA	Georgetown		NCAA
Big Eight	Nebraska		NCAA	Oklahoma State		NCAA
Big Sky	Boise State		NCAA	Idaho State	RS	
Big South	Liberty		NCAA	Campbell		
Big West	New Mexico State	RS	NCAA	UC Irvine		
Colonial	James Madison	RS	NCAA	Old Dominion	RS	
East Coast	Hofstra			Northeastern Illinois		
Great Midwest	Cincinnati		NCAA	Memphis State		
Metro	Louisville	RS	NCAA	Southern Mississippi		
Metro Atlantic	Loyola (MD)		NCAA	Manhattan		
Mid-American	Ohio	RS	NCAA	Miami (OH)		
Mid-Continent	WI-Green Bay	RS	NCAA	Illinois-Chicago		
Mid-Eastern	North Carolina A&T		NCAA			
Midwestern	Detroit			Evansville		
Missouri Valley	Southern Illinois	RS	NCAA	Northern Iowa		
North Atlantic	Drexel	RS	NCAA	Maine		
Northeast	Rider	RS	NCAA	Monmouth		
Ohio Valley	Tennessee State		NCAA	Murray State	RS	
Patriot	Navy	RS	NCAA	Colgate	RS	
Southeastern	Kentucky	RS	NCAA	Florida	RS	NCAA
Southern	UT-Chattanooga	RS	NCAA	Davidson		
Southland	SW Texas State		NCAA	North Texas		
Southwest	Texas	RS	NCAA	Texas A&M		
Southwestern Athletic	Texas Southern	RS	NCAA			
Sun Belt	SW Louisiana		NCAA	WKU	RS	NCAA
Trans America	Central Florida		NCAA	Stetson		
West Coast	Pepperdine		NCAA	San Diego		
Western Athletic	Hawaii		NCAA	BYU		

== 1995 ==
Conference	Winning School	Regular season champion	NCAA Tournament Bid	Losing School	Regular season champion	NCAA Tournament Bid
American West	Southern Utah	RS		CSU-Northridge		
Atlantic 10	Massachusetts	RS	NCAA	Temple		NCAA
Atlantic Coast	Wake Forest	RS	NCAA	North Carolina	RS	NCAA
Big East	Villanova		NCAA	Connecticut	RS	NCAA
Big Eight	Oklahoma State		NCAA	Iowa State		NCAA
Big Sky	Weber State	RS	NCAA	Montana	RS	
Big South	Charleston Southern			NC-Greensboro	RS	
Big West	Long Beach State		NCAA	New Mexico State		
Colonial	Old Dominion	RS	NCAA	James Madison		
Great Midwest	Cincinnati		NCAA	UAB		
Metro	Louisville		NCAA	Southern Mississippi		
Metro Atlantic	St. Peter's		NCAA	Manhattan	RS	NCAA
Mid-American	Ball State		NCAA	Eastern Michigan		
Mid-Continent	Valparaiso	RS		Western Illinois		
Mid-Eastern	North Carolina A&T		NCAA	Coppin State	RS	
Midwestern	WI-Green Bay		NCAA	Wright State		
Missouri Valley	Southern Illinois		NCAA	Tulsa	RS	NCAA
North Atlantic	Drexel	RS	NCAA	Northeastern		
Northeast	Mount St. Mary's		NCAA	Rider	RS	
Ohio Valley	Murray State	RS	NCAA	Austin Peay		
Patriot	Colgate	RS	NCAA	Navy		
Southeastern	Kentucky	RS	NCAA	Arkansas	RS	NCAA
Southern	UT-Chattanooga	RS	NCAA	Western Carolina		
Southland	Nicholls State	RS	NCAA	Northeast Louisiana		
Southwest	Texas	RS	NCAA	Texas Tech	RS	
Southwestern Athletic	Texas Southern	RS	NCAA			
Sun Belt	WKU	RS	NCAA	AR-Little Rock		
Trans America	Florida International		NCAA	Mercer		
West Coast	Gonzaga		NCAA	Portland		
Western Athletic	Utah	RS	NCAA	Hawaii		

== 1996 ==
Conference	Winning School	Regular season champion	NCAA Tournament Bid	Losing School	Regular season champion	NCAA Tournament Bid
American West	Southern Utah			Cal Poly-SLO	RS	
Atlantic 10	Massachusetts	RS	NCAA	Temple		NCAA
Atlantic Coast	Wake Forest		NCAA	Georgia Tech	RS	NCAA
Big East	Connecticut	RS	NCAA	Georgetown	RS	NCAA
Big Eight	Iowa State		NCAA	Kansas	RS	NCAA
Big Sky	Montana State	RS	NCAA	Weber State		
Big South	NC-Greensboro	RS	NCAA	Liberty		
Big West	San Jose State		NCAA	Utah State		
Colonial	Virginia Commonwealth	RS	NCAA	NC-Wilmington		
Conference USA	Cincinnati	RS	NCAA	Marquette		NCAA
Ivy League Playoff	Princeton	RS	NCAA	Pennsylvania	RS	
Metro Atlantic	Canisius		NCAA	Fairfield	RS	
Mid-American	Eastern Michigan	RS	NCAA	Toledo		
Mid-Continent	Valparaiso	RS	NCAA	Western Illinois		
Mid-Eastern	South Carolina State	RS	NCAA	Coppin State	RS	
Midwestern	Northern Illinois		NCAA	Detroit		
Missouri Valley	Tulsa		NCAA	Bradley	RS	NCAA
North Atlantic	Drexel	RS	NCAA	Boston University		
Northeast	Monmouth		NCAA	Rider		
Ohio Valley	Austin Peay		NCAA	Murray State	RS	
Patriot	Colgate	RS	NCAA	Holy Cross		
Southeastern	Mississippi State	RS	NCAA	Kentucky	RS	NCAA
Southern	Western Carolina	RS	NCAA	Davidson	RS	
Southland	Northeast Louisiana	RS	NCAA	North Texas		
Southwest	Texas Tech	RS	NCAA	Texas		NCAA
Southwestern Athletic	Mississippi Valley State	RS	NCAA			
Sun Belt	New Orleans	RS	NCAA	AR-Little Rock	RS	
Trans America	Central Florida		NCAA	Mercer		
West Coast	Portland		NCAA	Gonzaga	RS	
Western Athletic	New Mexico		NCAA	Utah	RS	NCAA

== 1997 ==
Conference	Winning School	Regular season champion	NCAA Tournament Bid	Losing School	Regular season champion	NCAA Tournament Bid
America East	Boston University	RS	NCAA	Drexel		
Atlantic 10	St. Joseph's	RS	NCAA	Rhode Island		NCAA
Atlantic Coast	North Carolina		NCAA	North Carolina State		
Big 12	Kansas	RS	NCAA	Missouri		
Big East	Boston College	RS	NCAA	Villanova	RS	NCAA
Big Sky	Montana		NCAA	CSU-Northridge		
Big South	Charleston Southern		NCAA	Liberty	RS	
Big West	Pacific	RS	NCAA	Nevada	RS	
Colonial	Old Dominion	RS	NCAA	James Madison		
Conference USA	Marquette		NCAA	UNC Charlotte	RS	NCAA
Metro Atlantic	Fairfield		NCAA	Canisius		
Mid-American	Miami (OH)	RS	NCAA	Eastern Michigan		
Mid-Continent	Valparaiso	RS	NCAA	Western Illinois		
Mid-Eastern	Coppin State	RS	NCAA			
Midwestern	Butler	RS	NCAA	Illinois-Chicago		
Missouri Valley	Illinois State	RS	NCAA	SW Missouri State		
Northeast	LIU-Brooklyn	RS	NCAA	Monmouth		
Ohio Valley	Murray State	RS	NCAA	Austin Peay	RS	
Patriot	Navy	RS	NCAA	Bucknell		
Southeastern	Kentucky		NCAA	Georgia		NCAA
Southern	UT-Chattanooga	RS	NCAA	Marshall	RS	
Southland	SW Texas State	RS	NCAA	Northeast Louisiana	RS	
Southwestern Athletic	Jackson State		NCAA			
Sun Belt	South Alabama	RS	NCAA	Louisiana Tech		
Trans America	College of Charleston	RS	NCAA	Florida International		
West Coast	St. Mary's (CA)	RS	NCAA	San Francisco		
Western Athletic	Utah	RS	NCAA	TCU		

== 1998 ==
Conference	Winning School	Regular season champion	NCAA Tournament Bid	Losing School	Regular season champion	NCAA Tournament Bid
America East	Delaware	RS	NCAA	Boston University	RS	
Atlantic 10	Xavier	RS	NCAA	George Washington	RS	NCAA
Atlantic Coast	North Carolina		NCAA	Duke	RS	NCAA
Big 12	Kansas	RS	NCAA	Oklahoma		NCAA
Big East	Connecticut	RS	NCAA	Syracuse	RS	NCAA
Big Sky	Northern Arizona	RS	NCAA	Montana State		
Big South	Radford		NCAA	NC-Asheville	RS	
Big Ten	Michigan		NCAA	Purdue		NCAA
Big West	Utah State	RS	NCAA	Pacific	RS	
Colonial	Richmond		NCAA	NC-Wilmington	RS	
Conference USA	Cincinnati	RS	NCAA	UNC Charlotte		NCAA
Metro Atlantic	Iona	RS	NCAA	Siena		
Mid-American	Eastern Michigan		NCAA	Miami (OH)		
Mid-Continent	Valparaiso	RS	NCAA	Youngstown State		
Mid-Eastern	South Carolina State		NCAA	Coppin State	RS	
Midwestern	Butler		NCAA	WI-Green Bay		
Missouri Valley	Illinois State	RS	NCAA	SW Missouri State		
Northeast	Fairleigh Dickinson		NCAA	LIU-Brooklyn	RS	
Ohio Valley	Murray State	RS	NCAA	Tennessee State		
Patriot	Navy	RS	NCAA	Lafayette	RS	
Southeastern	Kentucky	RS	NCAA	South Carolina		NCAA
Southern	Davidson	RS	NCAA	Appalachian State	RS	
Southland	Nicholls State	RS	NCAA	TX-Arlington		
Southwestern Athletic	Prairie View		NCAA			
Sun Belt	South Alabama	RS	NCAA	SW Louisiana		
Trans America	College of Charleston	RS	NCAA	Florida International		
West Coast	San Francisco		NCAA	Gonzaga	RS	
Western Athletic	UNLV		NCAA	New Mexico		NCAA

== 1999 ==
Conference	Winning School	Regular season champion	NCAA Tournament Bid	Losing School	Regular season champion	NCAA Tournament Bid
America East	Delaware	RS	NCAA	Drexel	RS	
Atlantic 10	Rhode Island		NCAA	Temple	RS	NCAA
Atlantic Coast	Duke	RS	NCAA	North Carolina		NCAA
Big 12	Kansas		NCAA	Oklahoma State		NCAA
Big East	Connecticut	RS	NCAA	St. John's		NCAA
Big Sky	Weber State	RS	NCAA	Northern Arizona		
Big South	Winthrop	RS	NCAA	Radford		
Big Ten	Michigan State	RS	NCAA	Illinois		
Big West	New Mexico State	RS	NCAA	Boise State	RS	
Colonial	George Mason	RS	NCAA	Old Dominion		
Conference USA	UNC Charlotte		NCAA	Louisville		NCAA
Metro Atlantic	Siena	RS	NCAA	St. Peter's		
Mid-American	Kent		NCAA	Miami (OH)	RS	NCAA
Mid-Continent	Valparaiso	RS	NCAA	Oral Roberts		
Mid-Eastern	Florida A&M		NCAA	South Carolina State	RS	
Midwestern	Detroit	RS	NCAA	Butler		
Missouri Valley	Creighton		NCAA	Evansville	RS	NCAA
Northeast	Mount St. Mary's		NCAA	Central Connecticut State		
Ohio Valley	Murray State	RS	NCAA	SE Missouri State		
Patriot	Lafayette	RS	NCAA	Bucknell		
Southeastern	Kentucky		NCAA	Arkansas		NCAA
Southern	College of Charleston	RS	NCAA	Appalachian State	RS	
Southland	TX-San Antonio		NCAA	SW Texas State	RS	
Southwestern Athletic	Alcorn State	RS	NCAA	Southern		
Sun Belt	Arkansas State		NCAA	WKU		
Trans America	Samford	RS	NCAA	Central Florida		
West Coast	Gonzaga	RS	NCAA	Santa Clara		
Western Athletic	Utah	RS	NCAA	New Mexico		NCAA

== 2000 ==
Conference	Winning School	Regular season champion	NCAA Tournament Bid	Losing School	Regular season champion	NCAA Tournament Bid
America East	Hofstra	RS	NCAA	Delaware		
Atlantic 10	Temple	RS	NCAA	St. Bonaventure		NCAA
Atlantic Coast	Duke	RS	NCAA	Maryland		NCAA
Big 12	Iowa State	RS	NCAA	Oklahoma		NCAA
Big East	St. John's		NCAA	Connecticut		NCAA
Big Sky	Northern Arizona		NCAA	CSU-Northridge		
Big South	Winthrop		NCAA	NC-Asheville		
Big Ten	Michigan State	RS	NCAA	Illinois		NCAA
Big West	Utah State	RS	NCAA	New Mexico State		
Colonial	NC-Wilmington		NCAA	Richmond		
Conference USA	Saint Louis		NCAA	DePaul		NCAA
Metro Atlantic	Iona		NCAA	Siena	RS	
Mid-American	Ball State	RS	NCAA	Miami (OH)		
Mid-Continent	Valparaiso		NCAA	Southern Utah		
Mid-Eastern	South Carolina State	RS	NCAA			
Midwestern	Butler	RS	NCAA	Detroit		
Missouri Valley	Creighton		NCAA	SW Missouri State		
Mountain West	UNLV	RS	NCAA	BYU		
Northeast	Central Connecticut State	RS	NCAA	Robert Morris		
Ohio Valley	SE Missouri State	RS	NCAA	Murray State	RS	
Patriot	Lafayette	RS	NCAA	Navy	RS	
Southeastern	Arkansas		NCAA	Auburn		NCAA
Southern	Appalachian State	RS	NCAA	College of Charleston	RS	
Southland	Lamar		NCAA	Northwestern State		
Southwestern Athletic	Jackson State		NCAA			
Sun Belt	LA-Lafayette	RS	NCAA	South Alabama	RS	
Trans America	Samford		NCAA	Central Florida		
West Coast	Gonzaga		NCAA	Pepperdine	RS	NCAA
Western Athletic	Fresno State		NCAA	Tulsa	RS	NCAA

== 2001 ==
Conference	Winning School	Regular season champion	NCAA Tournament Bid	Losing School	Regular season champion	NCAA Tournament Bid
America East	Hofstra	RS	NCAA	Delaware		
Atlantic 10	Temple		NCAA	Massachusetts		
Atlantic Coast	Duke	RS	NCAA	North Carolina	RS	NCAA
Big 12	Oklahoma		NCAA	Texas		NCAA
Big East	Boston College	RS	NCAA	Pittsburgh		
Big Sky	CSU-Northridge	RS	NCAA	Eastern Washington		
Big South	Winthrop		NCAA	Radford	RS	
Big Ten	Iowa		NCAA	Indiana		NCAA
Big West	Utah State		NCAA	Pacific		
Colonial	George Mason		NCAA	NC-Wilmington		
Conference USA	Charlotte		NCAA	Cincinnati	RS	NCAA
Metro Atlantic	Iona	RS	NCAA	Canisius		
Mid-American	Kent State	RS	NCAA	Miami (OH)		
Mid-Continent	Southern Utah	RS	NCAA	Valparaiso	RS	
Mid-Eastern	Hampton	RS	NCAA	South Carolina State	RS	
Midwestern	Butler	RS	NCAA	Detroit		
Missouri Valley	Indiana State		NCAA	Bradley		
Mountain West	BYU	RS	NCAA	New Mexico		
Northeast	Monmouth		NCAA	St. Francis (NY)	RS	
Ohio Valley	Eastern Illinois		NCAA	Austin Peay		
Patriot	Holy Cross	RS	NCAA	Navy		
Southeastern	Kentucky	RS	NCAA	Mississippi	RS	NCAA
Southern	NC-Greensboro		NCAA	UT-Chattanooga		
Southland	Northwestern State		NCAA	McNeese State	RS	
Southwestern Athletic	Alabama State	RS	NCAA			
Sun Belt	WKU	RS	NCAA	South Alabama	RS	
Trans America	Georgia State	RS	NCAA	Troy State		
West Coast	Gonzaga	RS	NCAA	Santa Clara		
Western Athletic	Hawaii		NCAA	Tulsa		

== 2002 ==
Conference	Winning School	Regular season champion	NCAA Tournament Bid	Losing School	Regular season champion	NCAA Tournament Bid
America East	Boston University	RS	NCAA	Maine		
Atlantic 10	Xavier	RS	NCAA	Richmond		
Atlantic Coast	Duke		NCAA	North Carolina State		NCAA
Atlantic Sun	Florida Atlantic		NCAA	Georgia State	RS	
Big 12	Oklahoma		NCAA	Kansas	RS	NCAA
Big East	Connecticut	RS	NCAA	Pittsburgh	RS	NCAA
Big Sky	Montana		NCAA	Eastern Washington		
Big South	Winthrop	RS	NCAA	High Point		
Big Ten	Ohio State	RS	NCAA	Iowa		
Big West	UC Santa Barbara		NCAA	Utah State	RS	
Colonial	NC-Wilmington	RS	NCAA	Virginia Commonwealth		
Conference USA	Cincinnati	RS	NCAA	Marquette		NCAA
Horizon	Illinois-Chicago		NCAA	Loyola-Chicago		
Ivy League Playoff	Pennsylvania	RS	NCAA	Yale	RS	
Metro Atlantic	Siena		NCAA	Niagara		
Mid-American	Kent State	RS	NCAA	Bowling Green		
Mid-Continent	Valparaiso	RS	NCAA	IUPUI		
Mid-Eastern	Hampton	RS	NCAA	Howard		
Missouri Valley	Creighton	RS	NCAA	Southern Illinois	RS	NCAA
Mountain West	San Diego State		NCAA	UNLV		
Northeast	Central Connecticut State	RS	NCAA	Quinnipiac		
Ohio Valley	Murray State		NCAA	Tennessee Tech	RS	
Pacific-10	Arizona		NCAA	USC		NCAA
Patriot	Holy Cross		NCAA	American	RS	
Southeastern	Mississippi State		NCAA	Alabama	RS	NCAA
Southern	Davidson	RS	NCAA	Furman		
Southland	McNeese State	RS	NCAA	LA-Monroe		
Southwestern Athletic	Alcorn State	RS	NCAA	Alabama A&M		
Sun Belt	WKU	RS	NCAA	LA-Lafayette	RS	
West Coast	Gonzaga	RS	NCAA	Pepperdine	RS	NCAA
Western Athletic	Hawaii	RS	NCAA	Tulsa	RS	NCAA

== 2003 ==
Conference	Winning School	Regular season champion	NCAA Tournament Bid	Losing School	Regular season champion	NCAA Tournament Bid
America East	Vermont		NCAA	Boston University	RS	
Atlantic 10	Dayton		NCAA	Temple		
Atlantic Coast	Duke		NCAA	North Carolina State		NCAA
Atlantic Sun	Troy State	RS	NCAA	Central Florida		
Big 12	Oklahoma		NCAA	Missouri		NCAA
Big East	Pittsburgh	RS	NCAA	Connecticut	RS	NCAA
Big Sky	Weber State	RS	NCAA	Eastern Washington		
Big South	NC-Asheville		NCAA	Radford		
Big Ten	Illinois		NCAA	Ohio State		
Big West	Utah State		NCAA	Cal Poly-SLO		
Colonial	NC-Wilmington	RS	NCAA	Drexel		
Conference USA	Louisville		NCAA	UAB		
Horizon	WI-Milwaukee		NCAA	Butler	RS	NCAA
Metro Atlantic	Manhattan	RS	NCAA	Fairfield		
Mid-American	Central Michigan	RS	NCAA	Kent State	RS	
Mid-Continent	IUPUI		NCAA	Valparaiso	RS	
Mid-Eastern	South Carolina State	RS	NCAA	Hampton		
Missouri Valley	Creighton		NCAA	Southern Illinois	RS	NCAA
Mountain West	Colorado State		NCAA	UNLV		
Northeast	Wagner	RS	NCAA	St. Francis (NY)		
Ohio Valley	Austin Peay	RS	NCAA	Tennessee Tech		
Pacific-10	Oregon		NCAA	USC		
Patriot	Holy Cross	RS	NCAA	American		
Southeastern	Kentucky	RS	NCAA	Mississippi State	RS	NCAA
Southern	East Tennessee State	RS	NCAA	UT-Chattanooga		
Southland	Sam Houston State	RS	NCAA	Stephen F. Austin		
Southwestern Athletic	Texas Southern		NCAA	Alcorn State		
Sun Belt	WKU	RS	NCAA	Middle Tennessee State		
West Coast	San Diego		NCAA	Gonzaga	RS	NCAA
Western Athletic	Tulsa		NCAA	Nevada		

== 2004 ==
Conference	Winning School	Regular season champion	NCAA Tournament Bid	Losing School	Regular season champion	NCAA Tournament Bid
America East	Vermont		NCAA	Maine		
Atlantic 10	Xavier		NCAA	Dayton	RS	NCAA
Atlantic Coast	Maryland		NCAA	Duke	RS	NCAA
Atlantic Sun	Central Florida		NCAA	Troy State		
Big 12	Oklahoma State	RS	NCAA	Texas		NCAA
Big East	Connecticut		NCAA	Pittsburgh	RS	NCAA
Big Sky	Eastern Washington	RS	NCAA	Northern Arizona		
Big South	Liberty	RS	NCAA	High Point		
Big Ten	Wisconsin		NCAA	Illinois	RS	NCAA
Big West	Pacific	RS	NCAA	CSU-Northridge		
Colonial	Virginia Commonwealth	RS	NCAA	George Mason		
Conference USA	Cincinnati	RS	NCAA	DePaul	RS	NCAA
Horizon	Illinois-Chicago		NCAA	WI-Milwaukee	RS	
Metro Atlantic	Manhattan	RS	NCAA	Niagara		
Mid-American	Western Michigan	RS	NCAA	Kent State	RS	
Mid-Continent	Valparaiso	RS	NCAA	IUPUI		
Mid-Eastern	Florida A&M		NCAA	Coppin State	RS	
Missouri Valley	Northern Iowa		NCAA	SW Missouri State		
Mountain West	Utah		NCAA	UNLV		
Northeast	Monmouth	RS	NCAA	Central Connecticut State		
Ohio Valley	Murray State		NCAA	Austin Peay	RS	
Pacific-10	Stanford	RS	NCAA	Washington		NCAA
Patriot	Lehigh	RS	NCAA	American	RS	
Southeastern	Kentucky	RS	NCAA	Florida		NCAA
Southern	East Tennessee State	RS	NCAA	UT-Chattanooga		
Southland	TX-San Antonio	RS	NCAA	Stephen F. Austin		
Southwestern Athletic	Alabama State		NCAA	Alabama A&M		
Sun Belt	LA-Lafayette	RS	NCAA	New Orleans		
West Coast	Gonzaga	RS	NCAA	St. Mary's (CA)		
Western Athletic	Nevada	RS	NCAA	UTEP	RS	NCAA

== 2005 ==
Conference	Winning School	Regular season champion	NCAA Tournament Bid	Losing School	Regular season champion	NCAA Tournament Bid
America East	Vermont	RS	NCAA	Northeastern		
Atlantic 10	George Washington	RS	NCAA	St. Joseph's	RS	
Atlantic Coast	Duke		NCAA	Georgia Tech		NCAA
Atlantic Sun	Central Florida	RS	NCAA	Gardner-Webb	RS	
Big 12	Oklahoma State		NCAA	Texas Tech		NCAA
Big East	Syracuse		NCAA	West Virginia		NCAA
Big Sky	Montana		NCAA	Weber State		
Big South	Winthrop	RS	NCAA	Charleston Southern		
Big Ten	Illinois	RS	NCAA	Wisconsin		NCAA
Big West	Utah State		NCAA	Pacific	RS	NCAA
Colonial	Old Dominion	RS	NCAA	Virginia Commonwealth		
Conference USA	Louisville	RS	NCAA	Memphis		
Horizon	WI-Milwaukee	RS	NCAA	Detroit		
Metro Atlantic	Niagara	RS	NCAA	Rider	RS	
Mid-American	Ohio		NCAA	Buffalo		
Mid-Continent	Oakland		NCAA	Oral Roberts	RS	
Mid-Eastern	Delaware State	RS	NCAA	Hampton		
Missouri Valley	Creighton		NCAA	SW Missouri State		
Mountain West	New Mexico		NCAA	Utah	RS	NCAA
Northeast	Fairleigh Dickinson		NCAA	Wagner		
Ohio Valley	Eastern Kentucky		NCAA	Austin Peay		
Pacific-10	Washington		NCAA	Arizona	RS	NCAA
Patriot	Bucknell		NCAA	Holy Cross	RS	
Southeastern	Florida		NCAA	Kentucky	RS	NCAA
Southern	UT-Chattanooga	RS	NCAA	NC-Greensboro		
Southland	SE Louisiana	RS	NCAA	Northwestern State	RS	
Southwestern Athletic	Alabama A&M	RS	NCAA	Alabama State		
Sun Belt	LA-Lafayette		NCAA	Denver	RS	
West Coast	Gonzaga	RS	NCAA	St. Mary's (CA)		NCAA
Western Athletic	UTEP		NCAA	Boise State		

== 2006 ==
Conference	Winning School	Regular season champion	NCAA Tournament Bid	Losing School	Regular season champion	NCAA Tournament Bid
America East	Albany	RS	NCAA	Vermont		
Atlantic 10	Xavier		NCAA	St. Joseph's		
Atlantic Coast	Duke	RS	NCAA	Boston College		NCAA
Atlantic Sun	Belmont	RS	NCAA	Lipscomb	RS	
Big 12	Kansas	RS	NCAA	Texas	RS	NCAA
Big East	Syracuse		NCAA	Pittsburgh		NCAA
Big Sky	Montana		NCAA	Northern Arizona	RS	
Big South	Winthrop	RS	NCAA	Coastal Carolina		
Big Ten	Iowa		NCAA	Ohio State	RS	NCAA
Big West	Pacific	RS	NCAA	Long Beach State		
Colonial	NC-Wilmington	RS	NCAA	Hofstra		
Conference USA	Memphis	RS	NCAA	UAB		NCAA
Horizon	WI-Milwaukee	RS	NCAA	Butler		
Metro Atlantic	Iona		NCAA	St. Peter's		
Mid-American	Kent State	RS	NCAA	Toledo		
Mid-Continent	Oral Roberts	RS	NCAA	Chicago State		
Mid-Eastern	Hampton		NCAA	Delaware State	RS	
Missouri Valley	Southern Illinois		NCAA	Bradley		NCAA
Mountain West	San Diego State	RS	NCAA	Wyoming		
Northeast	Monmouth		NCAA	Fairleigh Dickinson	RS	
Ohio Valley	Murray State	RS	NCAA	Samford		
Pacific-10	UCLA	RS	NCAA	California		NCAA
Patriot	Bucknell	RS	NCAA	Holy Cross		
Southeastern	Florida		NCAA	South Carolina		
Southern	Davidson		NCAA	UT-Chattanooga		
Southland	Northwestern State	RS	NCAA	Sam Houston State		
Southwestern Athletic	Southern	RS	NCAA	AR-Pine Bluff		
Sun Belt	South Alabama	RS	NCAA	WKU	RS	
West Coast	Gonzaga	RS	NCAA	Loyola Marymount		
Western Athletic	Nevada	RS	NCAA	Utah State		NCAA

== 2007 ==
Conference	Winning School	Regular season champion	NCAA Tournament Bid	Losing School	Regular season champion	NCAA Tournament Bid	
America East	Albany		NCAA	Vermont	RS	NIT	
Atlantic 10	George Washington		NCAA	Rhode Island			
Atlantic Coast	North Carolina		NCAA	North Carolina State		NIT	
Atlantic Sun	Belmont		NCAA	East Tennessee State	RS	NIT	
Big 12	Kansas	RS	NCAA	Texas		NCAA	
Big East	Georgetown	RS	NCAA	Pittsburgh		NCAA	
Big Sky	Weber State	RS	NCAA	Northern Arizona			
Big South	Winthrop	RS	NCAA	Virginia Military			
Big Ten	Ohio State	RS	NCAA	Wisconsin		NCAA	
Big West	Long Beach State	RS	NCAA	Cal Poly			
Colonial	Virginia Commonwealth	RS	NCAA	George Mason			
Conference USA	Memphis	RS	NCAA	Houston			
Horizon	Wright State	RS	NCAA	Butler		NCAA	
Metro Atlantic	Niagara		NCAA	Siena			
Mid-American	Miami		NCAA	Akron	RS		
Mid-Continent	Oral Roberts	RS	NCAA	Oakland			
Mid-Eastern	Florida A&M		NCAA	Delaware State	RS	NIT	
Missouri Valley	Creighton		NCAA	Southern Illinois	RS	NCAA	
Mountain West	UNLV	RS	NCAA	BYU	RS	NCAA	
Northeast	Central Connecticut State	RS	NCAA	Sacred Heart			
Ohio Valley	Eastern Kentucky		NCAA	Austin Peay	RS	NIT	
Pacific-10	Oregon		NCAA	USC		NCAA	
Patriot	Holy Cross	RS	NCAA	Bucknell			
Southeastern	Florida	RS	NCAA	Arkansas		NCAA	
Southern	Davidson	RS	NCAA	Charleston			
Southland	Texas A&M Corpus Christi	RS	NCAA	Northwestern State			
Southwestern Athletic	Jackson State	RS	NCAA	Mississippi Valley State			
Sun Belt	North Texas		NCAA	Arkansas State			
West Coast	Gonzaga	RS	NCAA	UC Santa Clara			
Western Athletic	New Mexico State		NCAA		Utah State		NIT

== 2008 ==
Conference	Winning School	Regular season champion	NCAA Tournament Bid	Losing School	Regular season champion	NCAA Tournament Bid
America East	UMBC	RS	NCAA	Hartford		
Atlantic 10	Temple		NCAA	St. Joseph's		NCAA
Atlantic Coast	North Carolina	RS	NCAA	Clemson		NCAA
Atlantic Sun	Belmont	RS	NCAA	Jacksonville		
Big 12	Kansas	RS	NCAA	Texas		NCAA
Big East	Pittsburgh		NCAA	Georgetown	RS	NCAA
Big Sky	Portland State	RS	NCAA	Northern Arizona		
Big South	Winthrop	RS	NCAA	UNC-Asheville	RS	NIT
Big Ten	Wisconsin	RS	NCAA	Illinois		
Big West	Cal State Fullerton		NCAA	UC Irvine		
Colonial	George Mason		NCAA	William & Mary		
Conference USA	Memphis	RS	NCAA	Tulsa		CBI
Horizon	Butler	RS	NCAA	Cleveland State		NIT
Metro Atlantic	Siena	RS	NCAA	Rider	RS	CBI
Mid-American	Kent State	RS	NCAA	Akron		NIT
Mid-Eastern	Coppin State		NCAA	Morgan State	RS	NIT
Missouri Valley	Drake	RS	NCAA	Illinois State		NIT
Mountain West	UNLV		NCAA	BYU	RS	NCAA
Northeast	Mount St. Mary's		NCAA	Sacred Heart		
Ohio Valley	Austin Peay	RS	NCAA	Tennessee State		
Pacific-10	UCLA	RS	NCAA	Stanford		NCAA
Patriot	American	RS	NCAA	Colgate		
Southeastern	Georgia		NCAA	Arkansas		NCAA
Southern	Davidson	RS	NCAA	Elon		
Southland	Texas-Arlington		NCAA	Northwestern State		
Summit	Oral Roberts	RS	NCAA	IUPUI		
Sun Belt	Western Kentucky		NCAA	Middle Tennessee		
SWAC	Mississippi Valley State		NCAA	Jackson State		
West Coast	San Diego		NCAA	Gonzaga	RS	NCAA
Western Athletic	Boise State	RS	NCAA	New Mexico State		

== 2009 ==
All winning schools played in the NCAA Tournament. If a conference's regular-season champion played in its tournament final, it will be indicated by italics.

Conference	Winning School	Losing School	Tournament Bid	Regular season champion (if different)	Tournament Bid
America East	Binghamton	UMBC	None		
Atlantic 10	Temple	Duquesne	NIT	Xavier	NCAA
Atlantic Coast	Duke	Florida State	NCAA	North Carolina	NCAA
Atlantic Sun	East Tennessee State	Jacksonville	NIT		
Big 12	Missouri	Baylor	NIT	Kansas	NCAA
Big East	Louisville	Syracuse	NCAA		
Big Sky	Portland State	Montana State	None	Weber State	NIT
Big South	Radford	VMI	None		
Big Ten	Purdue	Ohio State	NCAA	Michigan State	NCAA
Big West	Cal State Northridge	Pacific	CIT		
CAA	Virginia Commonwealth	George Mason	NIT		
Conference USA	Memphis	Tulsa	NIT		
Horizon	Cleveland State	Butler	NCAA		
MAAC	Siena	Niagara	NIT		
Mid-American	Akron	Buffalo	CBI	Bowling Green	NIT
MEAC	Morgan State	Norfolk State	None		
Missouri Valley	Northern Iowa	Illinois State	NIT		
Mountain West	Utah	San Diego State	NIT	BYU	NCAA
Northeast	Robert Morris	Mount St. Mary's	CIT		
Ohio Valley	Morehead State	Austin Peay	CIT	UT-Martin	NIT
Pac-10	USC	Arizona State	NCAA	Washington	NCAA
Patriot	American	Holy Cross	None		
SEC	Mississippi State	Tennessee	NCAA	LSU	NCAA
SoCon	Chattanooga	College of Charleston	CBI	Davidson	NIT
Southland	Stephen F. Austin	UTSA	None		
Summit	North Dakota State	Oakland	CIT		
Sun Belt	Western Kentucky	South Alabama	None		
SWAC	Alabama State	Jackson State	None		
WAC	Utah State	Nevada	CBI		
West Coast	Gonzaga	Saint Mary's	NIT		

== See also ==
- List of NCAA Division I men's basketball champions
