= Celester Collier =

American basketball player and coach

Celester "CC" Collier
Playing career

Basketball
- 1981–1983: Southwest Texas State

Coaching career (HC unless noted)

Basketball
- 1984–1986: Southwest Texas State

Head coaching record
- Overall: 12–42 (college basketball)

Celester "CC" Collier (born c. 1952) is a retired American basketball coach. Collier played basketball at Paris Junior College from 1979–1981, and Southwest Texas State University from 1981 to 1983. He coached at SWT for two years after playing. He was inducted into the Paris Junior College Hall of Fame and the Southwest Texas State Hall of Honor in 2001. Collier spent the last 31 years of a 43-year coaching career as the boys basketball head coach at Bowie High School in Austin, Texas.

He coached Veronica Mars creator and Dawson's Creek and Drive Me Crazy writer Rob Thomas at San Marcos High School in the late 1980s. Thomas's team has the second best record under Collier (32–4).

Collier won numerous District Coach of the Year awards, and was Bowie High School's Coach of the Year in 1994.

In 2004, Bowie High School was selected as the filming location for the feature film The Quiet. The Bowie High School basketball team was chosen to act in the film and Collier was the head coach for Shawn Ashmore's team in the movie.

In 2006, Collier guided Bowie to a 33–3 record and was named Central Texas Coach of the Year by the Austin American-Statesman.

In 2019, Collier led Bowie to its first regional tournament in 25 years.

== Head coaching record ==
Record table
Season	Team	Overall	Conference	Standing	Postseason
Southwest Texas State Bobcats (Gulf Star Conference) (1984–1986)
1984–85	Southwest Texas State	6–20	2-4	3rd	
1985–86	Southwest Texas State	6–22	1-5	4th	
Total:		12–42 (.222)			
National champion Postseason invitational champion Conference regular season champion Conference regular season and conference tournament champion Division regular season champion Division regular season and conference tournament champion Conference tournament champion
