= Championship Week =

US college basketball game showcase

Championship Week (shortened to Champ Week from 2016 onward) is ESPN's annual college basketball showcase of conference tournament games in the United States, which decide NCAA bids in early-to-mid-March. It typically lasts a little under two weeks, before post-season play begins. The low-major and mid-major conferences typically begin Championship Week and it culminates with Selection Sunday, during which the brackets are unveiled. Over the years, more games have been added with the expansion of ESPN's numerous multicast channels.

Coverage of the NCAA conference tournaments is no longer mostly limited to ESPN, since the proliferation of competing sports networks such as CBS Sports Network and Fox Sports 1, as well as CBS's longstanding over-the-air coverage of the last weekend of conference championships, all of which air similar marathons opposite Championship Week. This has allowed even further exposure of the tournaments on national television. For example, the Pac-12 tournament aired on the Pac-12 Network and alternately on Fox Sports 1 and ESPN, the Big East on Fox and Fox Sports 1, and the Mountain West on CBS and CBS Sports Network. Because of the resulting genericizing, ESPN abbreviated its branding to Champ Week beginning in 2016.

On radio, Westwood One's coverage of the conference tournaments is also billed as Championship Week.

== Process ==
ESPN typically schedules the games a year in advance. Many conferences get their only nationally televised game of the year during this week. ESPN programmer Burke Magnus points out that a single change can result in a domino effect.

== History ==
It began in 1986 with 27 games, not all of which were live. Championship Week coverage included cut-ins 45 games. The franchise was greatly expanded with the creation of ESPN2.

Due to the popularity of the expanded coverage of the college basketball tournaments aired on ESPN, it was later coined Championship Week.

In 1999, the two ESPN networks at the time aired 51 games, 25 of which were conference title games.

In 2000, ESPN and ESPN2 aired 58 total games (men's and women's) over 8 days including 31 conference title games. Both networks aired all the games from the Big East tournament.

In 2001, there were 57 games in nine days (25 of the 31 automatic berths). This also marked a turning point for the women's game, as their championship games were aired for the first time.

In 2003, ESPN and ESPN2 showed 61 games. ESPN2 added the Big 12 semifinals that year.

In 2005, the ESPN family of networks aired 99 men and women's games. They aired 26 of the 31 games which determined bids.

In 2007, ESPN and its sister stations aired 89 games in 11 days. The networks had parts of 25 tournaments, including 24 championship games.

In 2008, Championship Week lasted 10 days and featured 81 total games (63 men's games and 18 women's games). They televised 24 D-I men's title games and a D-II conference title game. Also, 18 women's games were televised highlighted by 11 Division I and one Division II title contests. Also, Bobby Knight debuted as an ESPN commentator.

In 2009, ESPN Radio broadcast Championship Week for the first time with the Big 12 tournament, carrying coverage of the semifinals and championship games. The ESPN family of networks televised 20 women's games including 13 title games. On the men's side, the ESPN networks televised 63 games, from 27 D-I conferences including 24 title games and a D-II conference title game.

In 2013, ESPN aired its final broadcast of the Big East men's basketball tournament after 18 years, dating back to 1996. The tournament moved to FS1 and Fox the following year.

In 2015, ESPN aired the ACC men's basketball tournament championship game live on Saturday night for the first time. Prior to 2015, the championship game was traditionally played on Sunday afternoons. The ACC men's basketball tournament has aired exclusively on the ESPN family of networks starting in 2021. Raycom Sports had aired its own coverage simultaneously until its syndication rights ended in 2019.

As previously mentioned, beginning in 2016, ESPN's coverage of Championship Week was rebranded as Champ Week.
