= Automatic bid =

An automatic bid is a bid or berth to a tournament, granted based on performance in prior competition, and not based on subjective picking (see: at-large bid). It is used in the United States in all professional sports, in which all playoff bids are automatic and determined by objective formulae; in college sports, all divisions (except the highest division of college football) use a mix of automatic bids and subjective selections to seed the postseason tournaments.

In Men's and Women's Division I college basketball, the teams that win their conference tournament are granted automatic berths to the main tournament. The Ivy League was the last Division I conference to institute a conference tournament, not doing so until the 2016–17 season; before then, the team with the best record in conference games advanced via automatic berth. Schools not in conferences, called "independents," have no conference tournament and can only advance to the NCAA Tournament via an at-large bid, which rarely happens unless the team performs well. As of the 2024-25 season, no Division I teams are competing as independents.

Similar automatic bid processes are used in other NCAA sports with a post-season tournament. This allows a team with a losing record to qualify for the NCAA tournament based on winning the automatic bid via tournament.

Another post-season college basketball tournament, the NIT, includes the best teams that were left out of the NCAA Tournament. Since the 2005 purchase of the NIT by the NCAA, automatic bids are now awarded to all regular season conference champions who did not win their conference tournament and did not get an at-large bid to the NCAA Tournament.

== See also ==
- Tournament Selection process / Selection Sunday
