= Matt Kingsley (basketball) =

American basketball player (born 1986)

Personal information
- Born: July 11, 1986 (age 40) Beaumont, Texas, U.S.
- Listed height: 6 ft 9 in (2.06 m)
- Listed weight: 230 lb (104 kg)

Career information
- High school: Cypress Creek (Houston, Texas)
- College: Stephen F. Austin (2005–2009)
- NBA draft: 2009: undrafted
- Playing career: 2009–2012
- Position: Power forward

Career history
- 2009: BC Šiauliai
- 2009: Polonia Warszawa
- 2010: Astrum Levice
- 2010: VOO Wolves Verviers-Pepinster
- 2010: Bàsquet Mallorca
- 2011–2012: Svendborg Rabbits

Career highlights
- Southland Player of the Year (2009); First-team All-Southland (2009)

Matthew Jacob Kingsley (born July 11, 1986) is an American basketball coach and former professional basketball player, best known for his college career at Stephen F. Austin State University.

Kingsley, a 6'9" power forward, played one season at Cypress Creek High School in Houston, Texas. He was largely recruited by Division II and junior college programs. Danny Kaspar, head coach of Stephen F. Austin, suggested Kingsley walk-on to the team, before offering him a scholarship and having him redshirt his first year. During his career at Stephen F. Austin, Kingsley scored 1,504 points and was named to All-Southland Conference teams for three consecutive years. As a senior in 2008–09, Kingsley averaged 15.8 points and 7.7 rebounds per game, earning Southland Conference Player of the Year and AP honorable mention All-American honors.

After not being selected in the 2009 NBA draft, Kingsley signed his first professional contract with BC Šiauliai in Lithuania. He ended up playing for four teams in four countries during the 2009–10 season. For 2010–11, Kinglsey signed with Bàsquet Mallorca, where he played until rupturing his Achilles tendon in December, 2010. After recovering, he played the 2011–12 season with the Svendborg Rabbits in Denmark.
