= Danny Kaspar =

American basketball player and coach

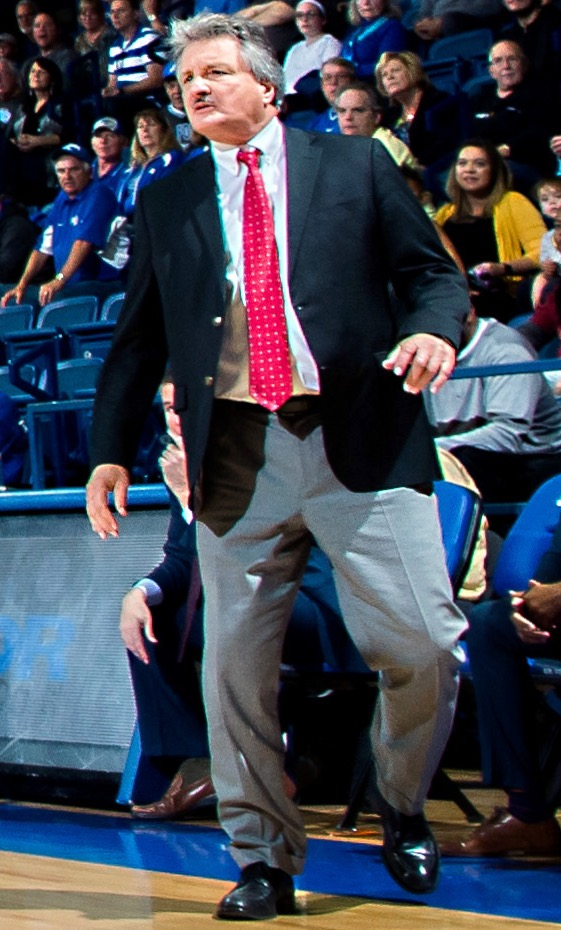
- Kaspar in 2019.

Biographical details
- Born: November 16, 1954 (age 71); Corpus Christi, Texas, U.S.

Playing career
- 1973–1974: Texas A&I
- 1974–1975: McLennan CC
- 1976–1978: North Texas State
- Position: Shooting guard

Coaching career (HC unless noted)
- 1979–1980: Lamar (asst.)
- 1980–1983: Midwestern State (asst.)
- 1983–1986: Stephen F. Austin (asst.)
- 1986–1991: Baylor (asst.)
- 1991–2000: Incarnate Word
- 2000–2013: Stephen F. Austin
- 2013–2020: Texas State

Head coaching record
- Overall: 584–302 (.659)
- Tournaments: 0–1 (NCAA Division I); 3–6 (NAIA Division I); 0–2 (NIT); 2–2 (CIT)

Accomplishments and honors

Championships
- Southland tournament (2009); 3 Southland regular season (2008, 2009, 2013); 5 Heart of Texas regular season (1993, 1994, 1996, 1998, 1999)

Awards
- 2x Southland Coach of the Year (2008, 2013); 3× Heart of Texas Coach of the Year (1994, 1998, 1999); Basketball Times NAIA Coach of the Year (1999); Hugh Durham Award (2013)

Daniel Joseph Kaspar (born November 16, 1954) is a former American college basketball coach. Kaspar served as men's basketball head coach at the University of the Incarnate Word, Stephen F. Austin State University, and Texas State University. He has also been an assistant coach at Lamar, Midwestern State and Baylor.

== Early life ==
Born in Corpus Christi, Texas, Kaspar graduated from Mary Carroll High School in Corpus Christi in 1973. He then attended Texas A&I University, a NAIA program at the time, and played shooting guard on the Texas A&I Javelinas basketball team for one year. He then transferred to McLennan Community College in Waco, Texas and North Texas State University. On the North Texas State Mean Green basketball team, Kaspar averaged 7 points as a junior in 1976–77 and 4.2 points as a senior in 1977–78. Kaspar graduated from North Texas State in 1978.

== Coaching career ==
Kaspar began his career as an assistant coach to Billy Tubbs at Division I Lamar University in the 1979–80 season, a season when Lamar finished the regular season first in the Southland Conference and advanced to the Sweet 16 round of the NCAA Tournament. In 1980, Kaspar became an assistant coach at Division II Midwestern State. Kaspar then became an assistant on Harry Miller's staff at Stephen F. Austin in 1983 for three seasons, including two seasons in Stephen F. Austin's transition from Division II to Division I (1984–1986).

From 1986 to 1991, Kaspar was an assistant to Gene Iba at Baylor.

=== Incarnate Word (1991–2000) ===
Kaspar was head coach at the NAIA program Incarnate Word for nine seasons from 1991 to 2000 and had a 219–52 record there. In his tenure at Incarnate Word, Kaspar earned four Heart of Texas Conference Coach of the Year honors and led Incarnate Word to five regular season conference championships.

=== Stephen F. Austin (2000–2013) ===
In 2000, Kaspar returned to Stephen F. Austin to be head coach, having previously been an assistant coach from 1983 to 1986. Kaspar had a 246–141 record at Stephen F. Austin. Stephen F. Austin had six seasons with 20 or more wins under Kaspar's tenure, four regular season Southland Conference championships, and made the 2009 NCAA tournament after winning the Southland tournament that year. Additionally, Stephen F. Austin appeared in the National Invitation Tournament in 2008 and 2013.

=== Texas State (2013–2020) ===
Kaspar became head coach at Texas State in 2013. Texas State finished 8–23 in Kaspar's first season. In seven seasons he has compiled a 119–109 record and lead his team to two CollegeInsider.com Postseason Tournament appearances.

=== Investigation and resignation ===
In June 2020, Texas State University initiated an investigation into allegations that Kaspar had made racially insensitive remarks to players. The investigation was launched after former player Jaylen Shead stated Kaspar dropped "a series of N-bombs around African-American players." Shead went on to reveal several of the racially charged remarks aimed at his African-American and European players, including saying that Shead was "running like the cops are behind him" during drills, telling another Black player he would be working at Popeyes due to his grades, and threatening to deport a European player if he kept "messing up." On September 22, 2020, Kaspar announced his resignation from Texas State.

== Head coaching record ==
Record table
Season	Team	Overall	Conference	Standing	Postseason
Incarnate Word Crusaders (Heart of Texas Conference) (1991–1999)
1991–92	Incarnate Word	21–9	6–4	3rd	
1992–93	Incarnate Word	28–4	8–2	1st	NAIA Division I First Round
1993–94	Incarnate Word	24–6	7–3	1st	NAIA Division I First Round
1994–95	Incarnate Word	26–8	8–6	3rd	NAIA Division I First Round
1995–96	Incarnate Word	20–9	11–3	1st	
1996–97	Incarnate Word	25–4	14–2	2nd	NAIA Division I First Round
1997–98	Incarnate Word	26–5	12–2	T–1st	NAIA Division I Elite Eight
1998–99	Incarnate Word	28–2	9–1	1st	NAIA Division I Second Round
Incarnate Word Crusaders (NAIA independent) (1999–2000)
1999–00	Incarnate Word	21–5			
Incarnate Word:		219–52 (.808)	75–23 (.765)		
Stephen F. Austin Lumberjacks (Southland Conference) (2000–2013)
2000–01	Stephen F. Austin	9–17	6–14	10th	
2001–02	Stephen F. Austin	13–15	10–10	T–5th	
2002–03	Stephen F. Austin	21–8	16–4	2nd	
2003–04	Stephen F. Austin	21–9	10–6	4th	
2004–05	Stephen F. Austin	12–15	6–10	9th	
2005–06	Stephen F. Austin	17–12	9–7	T–4th	
2006–07	Stephen F. Austin	15–14	8–8	T–3rd (West)	
2007–08	Stephen F. Austin	26–6	13–3	1st (West)	NIT Opening Round
2008–09	Stephen F. Austin	24–8	13–3	1st (East)	NCAA Division I First Round
2009–10	Stephen F. Austin	23–9	11–5	1st (East)	
2010–11	Stephen F. Austin	18–11	9–7	T–3rd (West)	
2011–12	Stephen F. Austin	20–12	12–4	2nd (West)	
2012–13	Stephen F. Austin	26–3	16–2	1st	NIT Opening Round
Stephen F. Austin:		246–141 (.636)	139–83 (.626)		
Texas State Bobcats (Sun Belt Conference) (2013–2020)
2013–14	Texas State	8–23	4–14	10th	
2014–15	Texas State	14–17	7–13	9th	
2015–16	Texas State	15–16	8–12	T–7th	
2016–17	Texas State	22–14	11–7	T–3rd	CIT Quarterfinals
2017–18	Texas State	15–18	7–11	T–9th	
2018–19	Texas State	24–10	12–6	T–2nd	CIT First Round
2019–20	Texas State	21–11	13–7	T–2nd	Postseason cancelled
Texas State:		119–109 (.522)	62–70 (.470)		
Total:		584–302 (.659)			
National champion Postseason invitational champion Conference regular season champion Conference regular season and conference tournament champion Division regular season champion Division regular season and conference tournament champion Conference tournament champion

1.Cancelled due to the Coronavirus Pandemic
