= Texas State Bobcats men's basketball =

College basketball team

| 2026–27 Texas State Bobcats men's basketball team |
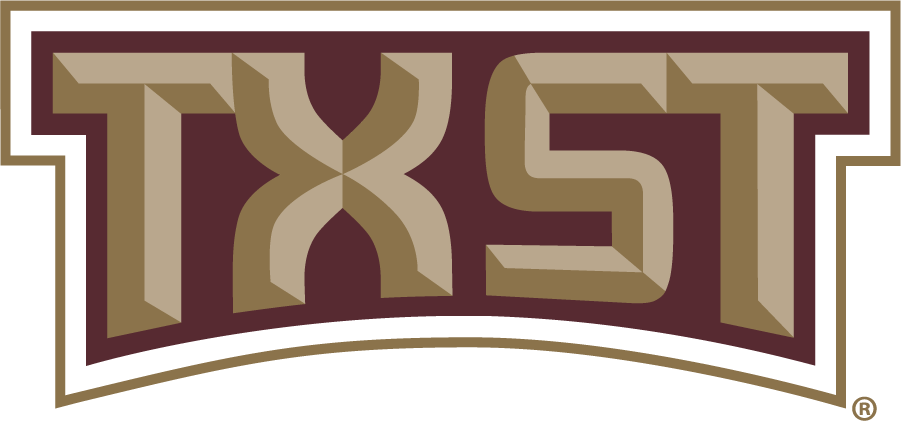
- University: Texas State University
- Head coach: Terrence Johnson (7th season)
- Location: San Marcos, Texas
- Arena: Strahan Arena (capacity: 10,000)
- Conference: Pac-12
- Nickname: Bobcats
- Colors: Maroon and gold
- All-time record: 1,423–1,245 (.533)

NCAA Division I tournament appearances
- 1994, 1997

Conference tournament champions
- Lone Star: 1979, 1980; Southland: 1994, 1997

Conference regular-season champions
- Lone Star: 1950, 1951, 1952, 1955, 1959, 1960, 1974, 1979, 1980; Southland: 1997, 1999; Sun Belt: 2021, 2022

The Texas State Bobcats men's basketball team is the basketball team that represents Texas State University. The school's team currently competes in the Pac-12 Conference (Pac-12). They are currently led by Terrence Johnson, who took over in September 2020 following the resignation of Danny Kaspar. The Bobcats last appeared in the NCAA tournament in 1997.

== History ==
The Bobcats' first season of college basketball was in 1920. The Bobcats were one of the charter members of the Lone Star Conference, which started play in 1934. Starting in 1950, the team won nine conference titles, winning the 1960 NAIA title in the process along with playing in the NAIA Final Four four times before leaving in 1983 to join the Gulf Star Conference, playing from 1984 until 1987 until the conference disbanded. They soon joined the Southland Conference from 1987 until 2012, when they left for the Western Athletic Conference. A year later, they left the WAC and joined the Sun Belt Conference. Southwest Texas State became Texas State in 2003. In June 2025, Texas State University announced the Bobcats will be joining the Pac-12 effective July 1, 2026.

== Head coaches ==
- Oscar W. Strahan (1920–1924, 1944–1946)
- Henry Shands (1924–1935)
- Joe Bailey Cheaney (1935–1939, 1942–1943)
- George Vest (1939–1942)
- Milton Jowers (1946–1961)
- Vernon McDonald (1961–1977)
- Dan Wall (1977–1981)
- Bob Derryberry (1981–1984)
- Celester Collier (1984–1986)
- Harry Larrabee (1986–1991)
- Jim Wooldridge (1991–1994)
- Mike Miller (1994–2000)
- Dennis Nutt (2000–2006)
- Doug Davalos (2006–2013)
- Danny Kaspar (2013–2020)
- Terrence Johnson (2020–Present)

== Postseason results ==
=== NCAA Division I Tournament results ===
| Year | Seed | Round | Coach | Opponent | Result |
|---|---|---|---|---|---|
| 1994 | No. 15 | First round | Jim Wooldridge | No. 2 Massachusetts | L 60–78 |
| 1997 | No. 16 | First round | Mike Miller | No. 1 Minnesota^ | L 46–78 |

^Minnesota win vacated for NCAA infractions

=== NIT results ===
The Bobcats have appeared in the National Invitation Tournament (NIT) one time. Their record is 0-1.

| Year | Round | Opponent | Coach | Result |
|---|---|---|---|---|
| 2022 | First round | North Texas | Terrence Johnson | L 63–67^{OT} |

=== CIT results ===
The Bobcats have appeared in the CollegeInsider.com Postseason Tournament (CIT) two times. Their combined record is 2–2.

| Year | Round | Opponent | Coach | Result |
|---|---|---|---|---|
| 2017 | First round Second round Quarterfinals | Lamar; Idaho; Saint Peter's | Danny Kaspar | W 70–60; W 64–55; L 44–49 |
| 2019 | First round | FIU | Danny Kaspar | L 81–87 |

=== NAIA Division I Tournament results ===
| Year | Seed | Round | Opponent | Coach | Result |
|---|---|---|---|---|---|
| 1951 | - | First round Second round | Morehead State; Regis | Milton Jowers | W 70–62; L 64–82 |
| 1952 | - | First round Second round Elite Eight; Semifinals; Third-place game Game | Arkansas Tech; New Mexico A&M; Lawrence Tech; Southwest Missouri; Portland | Milton Jowers | W 97–53; W69–52; W 65–57; L 62–70 ^{2OT} W 78–68 |
| 1957 | - | First round Second round | Upper Iowa; Southeastern Oklahoma State | Milton Jowers | W 104–71; L 78–98 |
| 1959 | 5 | First round Second round Elite Eight; Semifinals; Third-place game Game | Linfield (OR); Westminster; Lenoir-Rhyne; Tennessee State; Fort Hays State | Milton Jowers | W 93–61; W 61–58; W 80–78; L 62–64; W 87–80 |
| 1960 | 2 | First round Second round Elite Eight; Semifinals; National championship | Wisconsin-Oshkosh; Savannah State; Grambling State; William Jewell; Westminster | Milton Jowers | W 93–69; W 101–88; W 76–88; W 82–44; W 66–44 |
| 1961 | 11 | First round Second round Elite Eight | Central Connecticut; East Texas State Baptist; Northern Michigan | Milton Jowers | W 70–59; W 61–59; L 75–80 |
| 1979 | 8 | First round Second round Elite Eight; Semifinals; Third-place game | Kentucky State; St. Johns (MN); Cameron; Henderson State; Midwestern State | Dan Wall | W 78–74; W 79–75; W 77–73 ^{OT} L 57–58; W 101–88 |

== Bobcats in the NBA ==
- Torgeir Bryn, 1989-1990, Los Angeles Clippers
- Jeff Foster, 1999-2012, Indiana Pacers
