= UT Arlington Mavericks men's basketball statistical leaders =

The UT Arlington Mavericks men's basketball statistical leaders are individual statistical leaders of the UT Arlington Mavericks men's basketball program in various categories, including points, assists, blocks, rebounds, and steals. Within those areas, the lists identify single-game, single-season, and career leaders. The Mavericks represent the University of Texas at Arlington in the NCAA Division I Western Athletic Conference.

UT Arlington began competing in intercollegiate basketball in 1959. The NCAA did not officially record assists as a stat until the 1983–84 season, and blocks and steals until the 1985–86 season, but Texas's record books includes players in these stats before these seasons. These lists are updated through the end of the 2020–21 season.

== Scoring ==
Career
Rk	Player	Points	Seasons
1	Willie Brand	1907	1987–88 1988–89 1989–90 1990–91
2	Kevin Hervey	1783	2014–15 2015–16 2016–17 2017–18
3	Erick Neal	1557	2014–15 2015–16 2016–17 2017–18
4	Anthony Vereen	1477	2005–06 2006–07 2007–08 2008–09
5	Steven Thomas	1411	2002–03 2003–04 2004–05 2005–06
6	David Azore	1388	2018–19 2019–20 2020–21 2021–22
7	Paul Renfro	1380	1976–77 1977–78 1978–79 1979–80
8	Derrick Obasohan	1308	2000–01 2001–02 2002–03 2003–04
9	Jeffrey Stewart	1302	1978–79 1979–80 1980–81 1981–82
10	Brandon Long	1277	2005–06 2006–07 2007–08 2008–09 2009–10

Season
Rk	Player	Points	Season
1	Marquez Haynes	678	2009–10
2	Kevin Hervey	676	2017–18
3	Reger Dowell	608	2013–14
4	Sam Norton	599	1983–84
5	Kevin Hervey	597	2016–17
6	LaMarcus Reed	589	2011–12
7	Bobby Kenyon	573	1990–91
8	Erick Neal	552	2017–18
9	Anthony Vereen	532	2008–09
10	Eddie Stallings	525	1967–68

Single game
Rk	Player	Points	Season	Opponent
1	Dink Ford	44	1964–65	Texas Wesleyan
2	Steven Barber	43	2001–02	UTSA
3	Larry Moore	41	1972–73	Centenary
4	Willie Brand	39	1989–90	Prairie View A&M
	Jerry Janek	39	1962–63	Texas Wesleyan
	Marcell McCreary	39	2025–26	Southern Utah
7	Erick Neal	38	2017–18	Appalachian State
	Marquez Haynes	38	2009–10	UTSA
	Steven Barber	38	2001–02	Wichita State
	Mike Nau	38	1966–67	Lamar

== Rebounds ==
Career
Rk	Player	Rebounds	Seasons
1	Kevin Hervey	921	2014–15 2015–16 2016–17 2017–18
2	Mack Callier	857	1999–00 2000–01 2001–02 2002–03
3	Brandon Edwards	852	2010–11 2011–12 2012–13 2013–14
4	Paul Renfro	851	1976–77 1977–78 1978–79 1979–80
5	Bill Washington	842	1996–97 1997–98 1998–99 1999–00
6	Jordan Reves	760	2009–10 2010–11 2011–12 2012–13
7	Steven Thomas	737	2002–03 2003–04 2004–05 2005–06
8	John Reglin	700	1962–63 1963–64 1964–65 1965–66
9	Jermaine Griffin	695	2004–05 2005–06 2006–07 2007–08
10	Jorge Bilbao	664	2013–14 2014–15 2015–16 2016–17

Season
Rk	Player	Rebounds	Season
1	Brandon Edwards	314	2013–14
2	Sam Norton	304	1983–84
3	Mike Nau	301	1966–67
4	Kevin Hervey	298	2016–17
5	Larry Moore	297	1972–73
6	Kevin Hervey	282	2017–18
7	Johnny McDowell	280	1992–93
8	Albert Culton	275	1980–81
	Bruce Tibbetts	275	1964–65
10	Johnny Hamilton	274	2017–18

Single game
Rk	Player	Rebounds	Season	Opponent
1	Albert Culton	24	1980–81	Northeastern
2	Bruce Tibbetts	23	1964–65	Austin College
	Jerry Janek	23	1962–63	Texas Wesleyan
4	Jermaine Griffin	22	2005–06	UT Permian Basin
5	Mike Nau	21	1965–66	Texas Wesleyan
	Mike Nau	21	1966–67	Austin College
	Bruce Tibbetts	21	1964–65	McMurry
8	Sam Norton	20	1983–84	McNeese State
	Mike Nau	20	1966–67	Lamar
	Sherman Evans	20	1971–72	Samford

== Assists ==
Career
Rk	Player	Assists	Seasons
1	Erick Neal	756	2014–15 2015–16 2016–17 2017–18
2	Ronell Peters	650	1982–83 1983–84 1984–85 1985–86
3	Ricky Leggett	501	1977–78 1978–79 1979–80 1980–81
4	Shaquille White-Miller	455	2010–11 2011–12 2012–13 2013–14
5	Glover Cody	425	1990–91 1991–92
6	Jeffrey Stewart	375	1978–79 1979–80 1980–81 1981–82
7	Roderick Ford	370	1984–85 1985–86 1986–87 1987–88
8	Brady Dawkins	307	2002–03 2003–04 2004–05 2005–06
	Willie Brand	307	1987–88 1988–89 1989–90 1990–91
10	Cameron Catlett	291	2009–10 2010–11 2011–12 2012–13

Season
Rk	Player	Assists	Season
1	Erick Neal	237	2016–17
2	Glover Cody	229	1990–91
3	Erick Neal	222	2017–18
4	Erick Neal	211	2015–16
5	Ronell Peters	197	1983–84
6	Glover Cody	196	1991–92
7	Ronell Peters	168	1985–86
8	Ronell Peters	150	1984–85
9	David Payne	148	1969–70
	Javon Levi	148	2021–22

Single game
Rk	Player	Assists	Season	Opponent
1	Jermaine Johnson	17	1998–99	Sam Houston State
2	Sean Miller	16	1993–94	Northwestern State
3	Erick Neal	15	2017–18	Niagara
	Glover Cody	15	1991–92	North Texas
	Glover Cody	15	1990–91	Northwestern State
	Glover Cody	15	1990–91	Sam Houston State
6	Erick Neal	13	2017–18	UT Dallas
	Erick Neal	13	2016–17	BYU
	Erick Neal	13	2016–17	Louisiana
	Erick Neal	13	2016–17	UT Dallas
	Glover Cody	13	1991–92	Iowa State
	Glover Cody	13	1990–91	Army
	Ronell Peters	13	1983–84	ULM
	Ricky Leggett	13	1978–79	Denver
	Jesse Kemp	13	1976–77	McNeese State
	David Payne	13	1970–71	UT Pan American
	David Payne	13	1969–70	Texas Wesleyan

== Steals ==
Career
Rk	Player	Steals	Seasons
1	Roderick Ford	241	1984–85 1985–86 1986–87 1987–88
2	Bill Washington	231	1996–97 1997–98 1998–99 1999–00
3	Ricky Leggett	218	1977–78 1978–79 1979–80 1980–81
4	Erick Neal	217	2014–15 2015–16 2016–17 2017–18
5	Ronell Peters	215	1982–83 1983–84 1984–85 1985–86
6	Willie Brand	159	1987–88 1988–89 1989–90 1990–91
7	Donny Beacham	154	2000–01 2001–02 2002–03 2003–04
8	Ro'ger Guignard	136	2006–07 2007–08 2008–09
9	Jeffrey Stewart	127	1978–79 1979–80 1980–81 1981–82
10	Glover Cody	117	1990–91 1991–92

Season
Rk	Player	Steals	Season
1	Roderick Ford	96	1986–87
2	Ronell Peters	71	1985–86
3	Roderick Ford	70	1987–88
4	Glover Cody	66	1990–91
5	Erick Neal	65	2017–18
	Ricky Leggett	65	1979–80
7	Erick Neal	62	2016–17
	Ricky Leggett	62	1977–78
9	Ricky Leggett	61	1980–81
	DaJuan Gordon	61	2023–24

Single game
Rk	Player	Steals	Season	Opponent
1	Bill Washington	8	1999–00	McNeese State
	Leonard Wilson	8	1990–91	Nicholls
3	Bill Washington	7	1998–99	Stephen F. Austin
	Bill Washington	7	1998–99	McMurry
	Glover Cody	7	1990–91	North Texas
	Roderick Ford	7	1986–87	US International
	Roderick Ford	7	1986–87	Stephen F. Austin
	Ronell Peters	7	1985–86	Arkansas State

== Blocks ==
Career
Rk	Player	Blocks	Seasons
1	Jordan Reves	168	2009–10 2010–11 2011–12 2012–13
2	Jermaine Griffin	145	2004–05 2005–06 2006–07 2007–08
3	Kaodirichi Akobundu-Ehiogu	134	2020–21 2021–22
4	Brandon Edwards	132	2010–11 2011–12 2012–13 2013–14
5	Trey Parker	113	2007–08 2008–09 2009–10
6	Shemar Wilson	96	2021–22 2022–23 2023–24
7	Roy Johnson	85	2000–01 2001–02 2002–03 2003–04
8	Mack Callier	84	1999–00 2000–01 2001–02 2002–03
9	Johnny Hamilton	77	2017–18
10	Miles Robertson	75	1977–78 1978–79

Season
Rk	Player	Blocks	Season
1	Johnny Hamilton	77	2017–18
2	Kaodirichi Akobundu-Ehiogu	74	2021–22
3	Jordan Reves	71	2012–13
4	Shemar Wilson	65	2023–24
5	Kaodirichi Akobundu-Ehiogu	60	2020–21
6	Jermaine Griffin	58	2006–07
7	Jordan Reves	57	2011–12
8	Brandon Edwards	55	2013–14
9	Trey Parker	44	2008–09
10	Paul Renfro	43	1979–80

Single game
Rk	Player	Blocks	Season	Opponent
1	Paul Renfro	9	1979–80	Texas Wesleyan
2	Miles Robertson	8	1978–79	Louisiana Tech
3	Johnny Hamilton	7	2017–18	Georgia State
	Kaodirichi Akobundu-Ehiogu	7	2020–21	Louisiana
5	Johnny Hamilton	6	2017–18	Georgia Southern
	Brandon Williams	6	2014–15	Howard Payne
	Jordan Reves	6	2012–13	San Jose State
	Jordan Reves	6	2012–13	Louisiana Tech
	Jermaine Griffin	6	2006–07	Western Illinois
	Miles Robertson	6	1977–78	St. Edward's
	Trey Parker	6	2007–08	Sam Houston State
	Kaodirichi Akobundu-Ehiogu	6	2020–21	Arkansas State
	Kaodirichi Akobundu-Ehiogu	6	2021–22	Lamar
	Kaodirichi Akobundu-Ehiogu	6	2021–22	South Alabama
