= 2021–22 Virtus Bologna season =

Italian basketball club season

Virtus Bologna
2021–22 season
- Owner: Massimo Zanetti
- President: Massimo Zanetti
- Head coach: Sergio Scariolo
- Arena: Segafredo Arena
- LBA: 1st of 16
- Playoffs: Runners-up
- EuroCup Basketball: Winners
- Italian Cup: Semifinals
- Supercup: Winners

The 2021–22 season is Virtus Bologna's 93rd in existence and the club's 5th consecutive season in the top flight of Italian basketball.

== Kit ==
Supplier: Macron / Sponsor: Segafredo

Home	Away

== Players ==
=== Current roster ===
Virtus Segafredo Bologna roster
Players
Coaches

Pos.	No.	Nat.	Name	Ht.	Wt.	Age
C	0	(Italy)	Tessitori, Amedeo	2.08 m (6 ft 10 in)	97 kg (214 lb)	31 – 7 October 1994
SG	00	(France)	Cordinier, Isaïa	1.96 m (6 ft 5 in)	84 kg (185 lb)	29 – 28 November 1996
PG	1	(Italy)	Mannion, Nico	1.90 m (6 ft 3 in)	86 kg (190 lb)	25 – 14 March 2001
SG	3	(Italy)	Belinelli, Marco (C)	1.96 m (6 ft 5 in)	100 kg (220 lb)	40 – 25 March 1986
PG	6	(Italy)	Pajola, Alessandro	1.94 m (6 ft 4 in)	95 kg (209 lb)	26 – 9 November 1999
PF	7	(Bosnia and Herzegovina)	Alibegović, Amar	2.06 m (6 ft 9 in)	109 kg (240 lb)	31 – 31 March 1995
PF	8	(United States)	Hervey, Kevin	2.07 m (6 ft 9 in)	104 kg (229 lb)	30 – 9 July 1996
C	9	(Nigeria)	Udoh, Ekpe (injured)	2.08 m (6 ft 10 in)	111 kg (245 lb)	39 – 20 May 1987
PG	11	(Italy)	Ruzzier, Michele	1.83 m (6 ft 0 in)	80 kg (176 lb)	33 – 9 February 1993
C	14	(France)	Jaiteh, Mouhammadou	2.11 m (6 ft 11 in)	112 kg (247 lb)	31 – 27 November 1994
SG	17	(Italy)	Ceron, Marco	1.95 m (6 ft 5 in)	100 kg (220 lb)	34 – 16 June 1992
C	20	(Italy)	Barbieri, Matteo	2.11 m (6 ft 11 in)	105 kg (231 lb)	23 – 27 May 2003
PF	21	(Georgia (country))	Shengelia, Tornike	2.06 m (6 ft 9 in)	109 kg (240 lb)	34 – 5 October 1991
PG	23	(Italy)	Hackett, Daniel	1.96 m (6 ft 5 in)	97 kg (214 lb)	38 – 19 December 1987
PF	25	(United States)	Sampson, JaKarr	2.06 m (6 ft 9 in)	97 kg (214 lb)	33 – 20 March 1993
SF	34	(United States)	Weems, Kyle	1.98 m (6 ft 6 in)	100 kg (220 lb)	37 – 23 August 1989
G	44	(Serbia)	Teodosić, Miloš	1.96 m (6 ft 5 in)	90 kg (198 lb)	39 – 19 March 1987
SF	55	(Italy)	Abass, Awudu (injured)	1.98 m (6 ft 6 in)	100 kg (220 lb)	33 – 27 January 1993

Head coach

- (Italy) Sergio Scariolo

Assistant coach(es)

- (Serbia) Andrija Gavrilović
- (Italy) Andrea Diana
- (Italy) Cristian Fedrigo
- (Italy) Iacopo Squarcina
- (Italy) Edoardo Costa

Legend

- (C) Team captain
- Injured

- Roster
Updated: March 7, 2022

Note: Flags indicate national team eligibility at FIBA-sanctioned events. Players may hold other non-FIBA nationalities not displayed.

=== Depth chart ===
Pos.	Starting 5	Bench 1	Bench 2	Bench 3	Inactive
C	Mouhammadou Jaiteh	JaKarr Sampson	Amedeo Tessitori	Matteo Barbieri	Ekpe Udoh (injured)
PF	Tornike Shengelia	Kevin Hervey	Amar Alibegović
SF	Kyle Weems	Isaïa Cordinier	Marco Ceron		Awudu Abass (injured)
SG	Miloš Teodosić	Marco Belinelli	Nico Mannion
PG	Daniel Hackett	Alessandro Pajola	Michele Ruzzier

(colors: Italian or homegrown players; foreign players; young players)

=== Squad changes ===
==== In ====
No.	Pos.	Nat.	Name	Age	Moving from		Type	Ends	Transfer fee	Date	Source
11	PG	(Italy)	Michele Ruzzier	28	Pallacanestro Varese	(Italy)	2 years	June 2023	€15,000	5 July 2021	
8	PF	(United States)	Kevin Hervey	25	Lokomotiv Kuban	(Russia)	2 years	June 2023	Free	10 July 2021	
9	C	(Nigeria)	Ekpe Udoh	34	Beijing Royal Fighters	(China)	2 years	June 2023	Free	18 July 2021	
14	C	(France)	Mouhammadou Jaiteh	26	Gaziantep Basketbol	(Turkey)	2 years	June 2023	Free	20 July 2021	
1	PG	(Italy) (United States)	Nico Mannion	20	Golden State Warriors	(United States)	2 years	June 2023	Free	10 August 2021	
17	SG	(Italy)	Marco Ceron	29	Stings Mantova	(Italy)	1 year	June 2022	Free	13 August 2021	
15	SG	(United States)	Ty-Shon Alexander	23	Phoenix Suns	(United States)	2 years	June 2023	Free	8 September 2021	
25	PF	(United States)	JaKarr Sampson	28	Indiana Pacers	(United States)	2 years	June 2023	Free	27 September 2021	
00	SG	(France)	Isaïa Cordinier	24	Nanterre 92	(France)	2 years	June 2023	Free	6 October 2021	
23	PG	(Italy) (United States)	Daniel Hackett	34	CSKA Moscow	(Russia)	2 years	June 2024	$100,000	3 March 2022	
21	PF	(Georgia (country))	Tornike Shengelia	31	CSKA Moscow	(Russia)	4 months	June 2022	Free	6 March 2022	

1. In players: Players that signed after the beginning of the season

==== Out ====
No.	Pos.	Nat.	Name	Age	Moving to		Type	Transfer fee	Date	Source
9	PG	(Serbia)	Stefan Marković	33	Crvena zvezda	(Serbia)	End of contract	Free	1 July 2021	
11	PF	(Italy)	Giampaolo Ricci	29	Olimpia Milano	(Italy)	End of contract	Free	1 July 2021	
35	SF	(Serbia) (Italy)	Stefan Nikolić	24	Pallacanestro Cantù	(Italy)	End of contract	Free	1 July 2021	
45	C	(United States)	Julian Gamble	31	Tenerife	(Spain)	End of contract	Free	1 July 2021	
14	G	(United States)	Josh Adams	27	Tasmania JackJumpers	(Australia)	Exit option	Free	9 July 2021	
32	F/C	(United States)	Vince Hunter	26	Metropolitans 92	(France)	Sacked	Free	21 July 2021	
15	SG	(United States)	Ty-Shon Alexander	23	Pallacanestro Trieste	(Italy)	Mutual consent	Free	15 February 2022	

==== Confirmed ====
No.	Pos.	Nat.	Name	Age	Moving from		Type	Ends	Transfer fee	Date	Source
6	PG	(Italy)	Alessandro Pajola	21	youth team		5 + 4	June 2025	Youth system	2015–16	
44	PG	(Serbia)	Miloš Teodosić	34	Los Angeles Clippers	(United States)	3 + 1 years	June 2023	Free	13 July 2019	
34	SF	(United States)	Kyle Weems	31	Tofaş S.K.	(Turkey)	2 + 2 years	June 2023	Free	20 July 2019	
7	PF	(Bosnia and Herzegovina) (Italy)	Amar Alibegović	26	Virtus Roma	(Italy)	3 years	June 2023	Free	27 May 2020	
0	C	(Italy)	Amedeo Tessitori	26	Universo Treviso Basket	(Italy)	2 years	June 2022	Free	5 June 2020	
55	SF	(Italy)	Awudu Abass	28	Basket Brescia Leonessa	(Italy)	1 + 3 years	June 2024	Free	15 June 2020	
3	G/F	(Italy)	Marco Belinelli	35	San Antonio Spurs	(United States)	3 years	June 2023	Free	26 November 2020	

==== Coach ====
Nat.	Name	Age.	Previous team		Type	Ends	Date	Replaces		Date	Type
(Italy)	Sergio Scariolo	60	Toronto Raptors (assistant)	(United States)	3 years	June 2024	18 June 2021	(Serbia)	Aleksandar Đorđević	15 June 2021	End of contract

=== On loan ===
Pos.	Nat.	Name	Age	Moving from		Moving to		Date
C	(Senegal)	Gora Camara	20	Casale Monferrato	(Italy)	V.L. Pesaro	(Italy)	24 July 2021

== Competitions ==
=== Supercup ===
==== Quarterfinal ====
18 September 2021 Quarterfinals	Virtus Segafredo Bologna	74–66	Bertram Derthona Tortona	Casalecchio di Reno, Bologna
21:00 (CEST)	Scoring by quarter: 16–14, 20–22, 18–10, 20–20
Discovery+, Eurosport, DMAX	Pts: Hervey 18; Rebs: Hervey 18; Asts: Pajola 4 PIR: Hervey 32	Boxscore	Pts: Daum 19; Rebs: Filloy 7 Asts: Wright 9 PIR: Filloy 17	Arena: Unipol Arena; Referees: Manuel Mazzoni, Alessandro Martolini, Christian Borgo

==== Semifinal ====
20 September 2021 Semifinals	Umana Reyer Venezia	71–72	Virtus Segafredo Bologna	Casalecchio di Reno, Bologna
21:00 (CEST)	Scoring by quarter: 11–20, 20–14, 16–16, 24–22
Discovery+, Eurosport, DMAX	Pts: Tonut 16; Rebs: Tonut 9 Asts: Tonut, De Nicolao 4 PIR: Tonut 21	Boxscore	Pts: Hervey 17; Rebs: Hervey 9 Asts: Teodosić 8 PIR: Teodosić 21	Arena: Unipol Arena; Referees: Roberto Begnis, Mark Bartoli, Valerio Grigioni

==== Final ====
21 September 2021	AX Armani Exchange Milano	84–90	Virtus Segafredo Bologna	Casalecchio di Reno, Bologna
21:00 (CEST)	Scoring by quarter: 20–23, 15–21, 20–23, 29–23
Discovery+, Eurosport, DMAX	Pts: Shields 19; Rebs: Melli 10; Asts: Delaney, Rodríguez 5 PIR: Hall 23	Boxscore	Pts: Jaiteh 18; Rebs: Jaiteh 9 Asts: Pajola 7 PIR: Jaiteh 27	Arena: Unipol Arena; Referees: Saverio Lanzarini, Michele Rossi, Guido Giovannetti

Starters:			Pts	Reb	Ast
PG	23	(United States) Malcolm Delaney	8	1	5
SF	31	(United States) Shavon Shields	19	5	1
SF	70	(Italy) Luigi Datome	0	1	0
PF	9	(Italy) Nicolò Melli	10	10	1
C	42	(United States) Kyle Hines	4	6	2
Reserves:					
PG	13	(Spain) Sergio Rodríguez	17	2	5
PF	17	(Italy) Giampaolo Ricci	3	1	1
C	19	(Italy) Paul Biligha	DNP		
SF	21	(Italy) Riccardo Moraschini	0	0	0
SG	22	(United States) Devon Hall	13	6	2
F/C	24	(Greece) Dinos Mitoglou	8	5	1
SF	40	(Italy) Davide Alviti	2	3	0
Head coach:
(Italian Basketball Federation) Ettore Messina

AX Armani Exchange Milano	Virtus Segafredo Bologna

Milano	Statistics	Bologna
20/42(47.6%)	2 point field goals	25/41 (61.0%)
11/28 (39.3%)	3 point field goals	8/18 (44.4%)
11/11 (100.0%)	Free throws	16/23 (69.6%)
40	Rebounds	28
18	Assists	27
6	Steals	6
11	Turnovers	9
6	Blocks	44

Starters:			Pts	Reb	Ast
PG	6	(Italy) Alessandro Pajola	14	3	7
SG	3	(Italy) Marco Belinelli	9	1	2
SF	34	(United States) Kyle Weems	10	1	1
PF	8	(Italy) Kevin Hervey	4	4	1
C	14	(France) Mouhammadou Jaiteh	18	9	3
Reserves:					
C	0	(Italy) Amedeo Tessitori	0	2	1
PF	7	(Bosnia and Herzegovina) Amar Alibegović	13	0	0
PG	11	(Italy) Michele Ruzzier	DNP		
SG	15	(United States) Ty-Shon Alexander	7	2	5
C	20	(Italy) Matteo Barbieri	DNP		
PG	44	(Serbia) Miloš Teodosić	9	3	6
SF	55	(Italy) Awudu Abass	6	1	1
Head coach:
(Italian Basketball Federation) Sergio Scariolo

Supercup Finals MVP
(Italy) Alessandro Pajola
Game rules
Game played under FIBA rules.

2021 Italian Supercup champions
Virtus Segafredo Bologna
2nd title

=== Serie A ===
Pos	Team	Pld	W	L	PF	PA	PD	Pts	Qualification
1	Virtus Segafredo Bologna	30	26	4	2666	2364	+302	52	Qualification to Playoffs
2	AX Armani Exchange Milano	30	24	6	2465	2155	+310	48	Qualification to Playoffs
3	Germani Basket Brescia	30	21	9	2524	2310	+214	42	Qualification to Playoffs
4	Bertram Derthona Basket	30	17	13	2418	2412	+6	34	Qualification to Playoffs
5	Umana Reyer Venezia	30	17	13	2331	2297	+34	34	Qualification to Playoffs

Source: LBA

=== EuroCup ===
==== Regular season ====
Pos	Team	Pld	W	L	PF	PA	PD	Qualification
2	(Spanish Basketball Federation) Valencia Basket	18	12	6	1554	1440	+114	Advance to eighthfinals
3	(Basketball Federation of Slovenia) Cedevita Olimpija	18	11	7	1540	1479	+61	Advance to eighthfinals
4	(Italian Basketball Federation) Virtus Segafredo Bologna	18	11	7	1519	1465	+54	Advance to eighthfinals
5	(Basketball Federation of Montenegro) Budućnost VOLI	18	10	8	1413	1420	−7	Advance to eighthfinals
6	(Italian Basketball Federation) Umana Reyer Venezia	18	9	9	1380	1355	+25	Advance to eighthfinals

Source: EuroCup
Rules for classification: All points scored in extra period(s) were not counted in the standings, nor for any tie-break situation.

==== Playoffs ====
===== Eightfinal =====
20 April 2022	Virtus Segafredo Bologna (Italy)	75–67	(Lithuania) Lietkabelis	Bologna
20:45	Scoring by quarter: 18–14, 21–20, 17–18, 19–15
EuroLeague TV, Sky Sport, DAZN	Pts: Jaiteh 20; Rebs: Hervey, Shengelia 5 Asts: Shengelia 8 PIR: Weems 22	Boxscore	Pts: Orelik, Radičević 12; Rebs: Maldūnas 9 Asts: Kalaitzakis, Žemaitis 4 PIR: Maldūnas 15	Arena: Segafredo Arena; Attendance: 3,517; Referees: Robert Lottermoser, Tomasz Trawicki, Maxime Boubert

===== Quarterfinal =====
26 April 2022	Virtus Segafredo Bologna (Italy)	83–77	(Germany) ratiopharm Ulm	Bologna
21:00	Scoring by quarter: 25–17, 18–28, 24–17, 16–15
EuroLeague TV, Sky Sport, DAZN	Pts: Jaiteh 27; Rebs: Jaiteh 11; Asts: Teodosić 8 PIR: Jaiteh 38	Boxscore	Pts: Blossomgame 22; Rebs: Thornwell, Bretzel 8 Asts: Christon 7 PIR: Christon, Krimmer 18	Arena: PalaDozza; Attendance: 5,037; Referees: Miguel Ángel Pérez, Miloš Koljenšić, Eduard Udyanskyy

===== Semifinal =====
4 May 2022	Valencia Basket (Spain)	73–83	(Italy) Virtus Segafredo Bologna	Valencia
20:30	Scoring by quarter: 19–27, 19–23, 19–12, 16–21
EuroLeague TV, Sky Sport, DAZN	Pts: Rivero 17; Rebs: four players 4 Asts: Hermannsson 7 PIR: López-Arostegui 17	Boxscore	Pts: Shengelia 15; Rebs: Jaiteh 6 Asts: Teodosić 4 PIR: Shengelia 16	Arena: La Fonteta; Attendance: 7,224; Referees: Damir Javor, Gytis Vilius, Uroš Nikolić

===== Final =====
11 May 2022	Virtus Segafredo Bologna (Italy)	80–67	(Turkey) Frutti Extra Bursaspor	Bologna
20:30	Scoring by quarter: 25–12, 16–19, 21–22, 18–14
EuroLeague TV, Sky Sport, DAZN	Pts: Teodosić 21; Rebs: Jaiteh 10; Asts: Pajola 6 PIR: Weems 16	Boxscore	Pts: Dudzinski 14; Rebs: Dudzinski 7 Asts: Andrews, Bitim 3 PIR: Hayes 20	Arena: Segafredo Arena; Attendance: 10,000; Referees: Saša Pukl, Anne Panther, Emilio Pérez

Starters:			Pts	Reb	Ast
PG	23	(Italy) Daniel Hackett	1	5	2
SG	44	(Serbia) Miloš Teodosić	21	1	3
SF	34	(United States) Kyle Weems	13	4	2
PF	21	(Georgia (country)) Tornike Shengelia	5	7	2
C	14	(France) Mouhammadou Jaiteh	13	10	1
Reserves:					
C	0	(Italy) Amedeo Tessitori	0	1	0
SG	00	(France) Isaïa Cordinier	0	2	0
PG	1	(Italy) Nico Mannion	0	0	0
SG	3	(Italy) Marco Belinelli	12	2	3
G	6	(Italy) Alessandro Pajola	0	1	6
PF	8	(United States) Kevin Hervey	4	3	2
PF	25	(United States) JaKarr Sampson	11	5	1
Head coach:
(Italian Basketball Federation) Sergio Scariolo

Virtus Bologna	Bursaspor

V. Bologna	Statistics	Bursaspor
21/39 (53.8%)	2-pt field goals	15/27(55.6%)
9/28 (32.1%)	3-pt field goals	6/26 (23.1%)
11/16 (68.8%)	Free throws	19/24 (79.2%)
17	Offensive rebounds	8
27	Defensive rebounds	22
44	Total rebounds	30
22	Assists	11
10	Turnovers	14
8	Steals	2
5	Blocks	2
23	Fouls	20

2021–22 EuroCup champions

Virtus Segafredo Bologna
(1st title)

Starters:			Pts	Reb	Ast
PG	5	(Montenegro) Derek Needham	11	2	0
SG	12	(United States) Andrew Andrews	6	4	3
SF	10	(Turkey) Onuralp Bitim	12	5	3
PF	23	(United States) Dave Dudzinski	14	7	0
C	13	(Central African Republic) Kevarrius Hayes	6	4	3
Reserves:					
G/F	0	(Puerto Rico) John Holland	3	1	0
F/C	1	(Turkey) Tarık Sezgün	DNP		
PG	4	(Turkey) Mithat Can Özalp	DNP		
PF	7	(Turkey) Metin Türen	0	2	2
G/F	8	(Turkey) Birkan Batuk	DNP		
PG	9	(Turkey) Ömer Utku Al	3	0	0
F/C	22	(Turkey) Ayberk Olmaz	DNP		
Head coach:
(Basketball Federation of Serbia) Dušan Alimpijević
