= 2020 Turkish Basketball Cup =

- Season: 2020
- Duration: 11–16 February 2020
- Games played: 7
- Teams: 8

Finals
- Champions: Fenerbahçe Beko (7th title)
- Runners-up: Darüşşafaka

Awards
- Final MVP: (Italy) Luigi Datome

Statistical leaders
Points	Johnny Hamilton	14.6
Rebounds	Johnny Hamilton	9.3
Assists	Kostas Sloukas	6.3

The 2020 Turkish Basketball Cup (Turkish: 2020 Basketbol Erkekler Türkiye Kupası) was the 35th edition of Turkey's top-tier level professional national domestic basketball cup competition. The quarter-finals of tournament was held from 11 to 12 February 2020 in 4 different locations and then semi-finals and the final were held from 14 to 16 February 2020 in the Ankara Arena in Ankara, Turkey.

== Qualified teams ==
The top eight placed teams after the first half of the top-tier level Basketball Super League 2019–20 season qualified for the tournament. The four highest placed teams are going to play the lowest seeded teams in the quarter-finals. The competition was played under a single elimination format.

Pos	Team	Pld	W	L	PF	PA	PD	Pts	Seeding
1	Anadolu Efes	15	14	1	1338	1137	+201	29	Seeded
2	Pınar Karşıyaka	15	12	3	1244	1035	+209	27	Seeded
3	Fenerbahçe Beko	15	12	3	1197	1074	+123	27	Seeded
4	Galatasaray Doğa Sigorta	15	11	4	1231	1182	+49	26	Seeded
5	Tofaş	15	10	5	1322	1184	+138	25	Unseeded
6	Teksüt Bandırma	15	9	6	1254	1211	+43	24	Unseeded
7	Darüşşafaka Tekfen	15	8	7	1192	1137	+55	23	Unseeded
8	Türk Telekom	15	7	8	1180	1175	+5	22	Unseeded

Source: Basketbol Süper Ligi

== Draw ==
The 2020 Turkish Basketball Cup was drawn on 27 January 2020. The seeded teams were paired in the quarterfinals with the non-seeded teams.

== Bracket ==
Quarterfinals; February 11–12
1	Anadolu Efes	71
7	Darüşşafaka Tekfen	81
4	Galatasaray Doğa Sigorta	98
5	Tofaş	81
2	Pınar Karşıyaka	56
8	Türk Telekom	62
3	Fenerbahçe	100
6	Teksüt Bandırma	70

Semifinals; February 14
7	Darüşşafaka Tekfen	85
4	Galatasaray Doğa Sigorta	71
8	Türk Telekom	81
3	Fenerbahçe	83

Final; February 16
7	Darüşşafaka Tekfen	71
3	Fenerbahçe	74

== Quarterfinals ==
11 February 2020	Darüşşafaka Tekfen	81–71	Anadolu Efes	Istanbul
19:00 TRT (UTC +3)	Scoring by quarter: 24–14, 14–25, 20–10, 23–22
Tivibuspor	Pts: Browne 22; Rebs: Jones 11; Asts: Browne 5 PIR: Browne, Hamilton 20	Report	Pts: Simon 22; Rebs: Pleiß 8 Asts: Simon 5 PIR: Simon 17	Arena: Volkswagen Arena; Attendance: 2,845; Referees: Erşan Kartal, Kaan Büyükçil, Osman Sinan İşgüder

11 February 2020	Galatasaray Doğa Sigorta	98–81	Tofaş	Istanbul
21:00 TRT (UTC +3)	Scoring by quarter: 25–24, 30–23, 18–17, 25–17
Tivibuspor	Pts: Auguste 32; Rebs: Auguste 11; Asts: Webster 10; PIR: Auguste 38	Report	Pts: Yaşar 19; Rebs: Phillip 5 Asts: Ermiş 7 PIR: Phillip 20	Arena: Sinan Erdem Dome; Attendance: 1,900; Referees: Emin Moğulkoç, Aytuğ Ekti, Ayşe Nur Yazıcıoğlu

12 February 2020	Türk Telekom	62–56	Pınar Karşıyaka	Ankara
19:00 TRT (UTC +3)	Scoring by quarter: 17–10, 10–17, 14–11, 21–18
Tivibuspor	Pts: Wiltjer 15; Rebs: Fall 15; Asts: Wiltjer 6 PIR: Fall 28	Report	Pts: Taylor, M'Baye 9 Rebs: Birsen 9 Asts: Triche, M'Baye 3 PIR: Morgan 9	Arena: Ankara Arena; Attendance: 6,760; Referees: Yener Yılmaz, Fatih Arslanoğlu, Alper Özgök

12 February 2020	Fenerbahçe Beko	100–70	Teksüt Bandırma	Istanbul
21:00 TRT (UTC +3)	Scoring by quarter: 22–22, 24–10, 33–10, 21–18
Tivibuspor	Pts: Mahmutoğlu 18; Rebs: Veselý 11; Asts: Sloukas 11; PIR: Veselý 24	Report	Pts: Terry 15; Rebs: Haltalı 6 Asts: Hummer, Kalinoski 3 PIR: Terry 19	Arena: Ülker Sports and Event Hall; Attendance: 2,310; Referees: Mehmet Keseratar, Mehmet Serdar Ünal, Kerem Baki

== Semifinals ==
14 February 2020	Darüşşafaka Tekfen	85–71	Galatasaray Doğa Sigorta	Ankara
17:30 TRT (UTC +3)	Scoring by quarter: 13–20, 24–18, 19–12, 29–21
Tivibuspor	Pts: Özmızrak 25; Rebs: Hamilton 11; Asts: Özmızrak 7 PIR: Özmızrak 33	Report	Pts: Harrison, Köksal 15; Rebs: Poythress 8 Asts: Webster 7 PIR: Köksal 17	Arena: Ankara Arena; Referees: Mehmet Keserater, Alper Altuğ Köselerli, Can Mavisu

14 February 2020	Türk Telekom	81–83	Fenerbahçe Beko	Ankara
20:30 TRT (UTC +3)	Scoring by quarter: 23–21, 25–24, 21–24, 12–14
Tivibuspor	Pts: Campbell 19; Rebs: Türen 10; Asts: Campbell, Baygül 4 PIR: Campbell 19	Report	Pts: de Colo 19; Rebs: Kalinić, Veselý 8 Asts: Kalinić, Sloukas 4 PIR: Kalinić 25	Arena: Ankara Arena; Referees: Emin Moğulkoç, Mehmet Karabilecen, Semih Vural

== Final ==
16 February 2020	Darüşşafaka Tekfen	71–74	Fenerbahçe Beko	Ankara
17:00 TRT (UTC +3)	Scoring by quarter: 11–13, 19–17, 18–17, 23–27
Tivibuspor	Pts: Hamilton 20; Rebs: Hamilton 10; Asts: Colson 5 PIR: Hamilton 19	Report	Pts: three players 15; Rebs: three players 5 Asts: Sloukas, Dixon 4 PIR: Datome 18	Arena: Ankara Arena; Referees: Erşan Kartal, Osman Sinan İşgüder, Seher Ayşe Nur Yazıcıoğlu

Starters:			Pts	Reb	Ast
PG	8	(Puerto Rico) Gary Browne	6	2	2
SG	32	(Turkey) Sinan Güler	1	1	2
SF	50	(United States) Bonzie Colson	13	9	5
PF	21	(Hungary) Jarrod Jones	5	1	1
C	12	(Trinidad and Tobago) Johnny Hamilton	20	10	0
Reserves:					
PG	3	(Turkey) Kartal Özmızrak	5	1	2
C	6	(Germany) Mahir Ağva	DNP		
PG	10	(Turkey) Doruk Dora	0	2	0
PF	11	(Turkey) Berk Demir	3	2	0
SF	14	(Turkey) Erkan Veyseloğlu	5	1	0
PG	18	(Turkey) Doğuş Özdemiroğlu	13	3	1
PF	22	(Turkey) Selim Troy Şav	0	0	0
Head coach:
(Turkish Basketball Federation) Selçuk Ernak

Darüşşafaka	Fenerbahçe

Darüşşafaka	Statistics	Fenerbahçe
21/41 (51.2%)	2-point field goals	15/30 (50%)
11/21 (52.4%)	3-point field goals	10/27 (37%)
11/21 (52.4%)	Free throws	14/17 (82.3%)
15	Offensive rebounds	10
22	Defensive rebounds	24
37	Total rebounds	34
13	Assists	16
8	Steals	8
15	Turnovers	16
4	Blocks	13

Starters:			Pts	Reb	Ast
PG	16	(Greece) Kostas Sloukas	15	5	4
SG	19	(France) Nando de Colo	15	3	2
SF	70	(Italy) Luigi Datome	15	5	0
PF	12	(Serbia) Nikola Kalinić	12	4	3
C	24	(Czech Republic) Jan Veselý	10	5	2
Reserves:					
G/F	3	(Turkey) Ergi Tırpancı	DNP		
G	8	(Turkey) Ekrem Sancaklı	0	0	0
SG	10	(Turkey) Melih Mahmutoğlu	2	1	0
SF	18	(Turkey) Egehan Arna	0	1	0
PF	32	(Turkey) Berkay Candan	0	0	0
PG	35	(Turkey) Bobby Dixon	3	1	4
C	44	(Jordan) Ahmet Düverioğlu	2	2	1
Head coach:
(Basketball Federation of Serbia) Željko Obradović

== See also ==
- 2019–20 Basketbol Süper Ligi
