= Scott Cross (basketball) =

American basketball coach (born 1974)

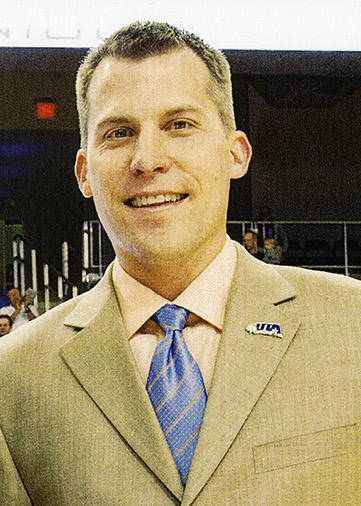
- Scott Cross at UTA in 2012

Current position
- Title: Head coach
- Team: Georgia Tech
- Conference: ACC
- Record: 5–1 (.833)

Biographical details
- Born: December 3, 1974 (age 51); Garland, Texas, U.S.

Playing career
- 1994–1995: Tyler JC
- 1995–1998: Texas–Arlington
- Position: Guard

Coaching career (HC unless noted)
- 1998–2006: Texas–Arlington (assistant)
- 2006–2018: Texas–Arlington/UT Arlington
- 2018–2019: TCU (assistant)
- 2019–2026: Troy
- 2026–present: Georgia Tech

Head coaching record
- Overall: 355–261 (.576)
- Tournaments: 0–3 (NCAA Division I); 2–2 (NIT); 0–1 (CBI); 1–2 (CIT)

Accomplishments and honors

Championships
- Southland tournament (2008); 2 Sun Belt tournament (2025, 2026); Southland West Division (2012); 3 Sun Belt regular season (2017, 2025, 2026)

Awards
- Southland Coach of the Year (2012); 2× Sun Belt Coach of the Year (2017, 2026)

Records
- Most wins in UTA history (225); Most wins in a season in UTA history (27)

Scott Michael Cross (born December 3, 1974) is an American college basketball coach who is currently head men's basketball coach at Georgia Tech. He is the former head coach at Troy and at University of Texas at Arlington (UT Arlington), where he played college basketball.

== Early life and education ==
Growing up in Garland, Texas, Cross graduated from North Garland High School in 1993. He attended the University of Texas at San Antonio for one year before beginning his college basketball player at Tyler Junior College in 1994–95. Cross then transferred to the University of Texas at Arlington, where he played at guard on the UT Arlington Mavericks men's basketball team from 1995 to 1998 under head coach Eddie McCarter. In 82 career games at UT Arlington, Cross averaged 9.3 points, 2.8 rebounds, and 2.7 assists. A two-time Academic All-American, Cross graduated from UT Arlington in 1998 with a bachelor's degree in marketing and 4.0 GPA.

== Coaching career ==
=== UT Arlington assistant (1998–2006) ===
After graduating, Cross became an assistant coach at UT Arlington under McCarter in 1998. Cross helped UT Arlington share the 2004 Southland Conference regular season title. Following the resignation of McCarter, on April 21, 2006, UT Arlington promoted Cross to head coach.

=== UT Arlington (2006–2018) ===
Cross was head coach at UT Arlington from 2006 to 2018. In his second season, Cross led UT Arlington to the Southland tournament title and first ever NCAA tournament appearance. The Southland Conference named Cross Coach of the Year after UT Arlington won the 2012 regular season title. Cross was also a Finalist for the Hugh Durham National Coach of the Year Award. That same season, UT Arlington appeared in the 2012 National Invitation Tournament.

In 2012–13, UT Arlington temporarily moved to the Western Athletic Conference (WAC) and finished the season 19–14 (11–7 WAC) with an appearance in the 2013 CollegeInsider.com Postseason Tournament. The following season, UT Arlington moved to the Sun Belt Conference.

During the 2015-2016 season, Cross was able to lead his Mavericks to big program victories over Ohio State and Memphis. They would finish the season with a 24-11 record, receiving an invitation to the 2016 CollegeInsider.com Postseason Tournament, where they would beat Savannah State in the first round before falling in the quarterfinals. Following the conclusion of the season, Cross was named a finalist for the Skip Prosser Man of the Year Award.

The 27–9 record in 2016–17 set a new program record for wins. That season, UT-Arlington defeated Texas for the first time on November 29. Then on December 8, UT Arlington upset no. 12 Saint Mary's 65–51, the first win over a ranked opponent in program history. The 2016–17 team won the program's first Sun Belt regular season title, for which Cross was named Sun Belt Coach of the Year. UTA would receive an invitation to the 2017 National Invitation Tournament, where they would make it to the quarterfinals after defeating BYU and Akron. From 2014 to 2018, Cross coached power forward Kevin Hervey, who would be selected in the second round of the 2018 NBA draft, the first Maverick taken since Albert Culton 1982 and he would become the first UT Arlington player to play in the NBA.

Following a 21–13 season, Cross was fired on March 26, 2018, with UTA athletic director Jim Baker citing a need for new leadership in the program. In 12 seasons, he had a 225–161 record, for the most wins of any coach in program history. He is the only UT Arlington head coach with a career winning record.

=== TCU assistant (2018–2019) ===
A few weeks after his firing, on April 12, Cross was hired by Jamie Dixon to be an assistant coach with the TCU Horned Frogs men's basketball team. While at TCU, Cross became Dixon's primary game plan strategist during the season. Cross would help lead the Horned Frogs to a 23–14 record and an appearance in the semifinals of the 2019 National Invitation Tournament.

=== Troy (2019–2026) ===
On March 26, 2019, Cross was named the new head coach of the men's basketball team at Troy University. Troy went 9–22 in Cross's first season as head coach.

Cross had his breakthrough season at Troy during the 2021-2022 season, when Troy finished the season with a 20-11 (10-6) record, winning the inaugural Paradise Classic tournament during the season and receiving an invitation to the postseason College Basketball Invitational. Cross continued his success at Troy, winning the Sun Belt Conference tournament in 2025 and 2026.

=== Georgia Tech (2026–present) ===
In March 2026, Cross was announced as the next head men's basketball coach at Georgia Tech.

== Head coaching record ==
Record table
Season	Team	Overall	Conference	Standing	Postseason
Texas–Arlington Mavericks (Southland Conference) (2006–2012)
2006–07	Texas–Arlington	13–17	8–8	T–3rd (West)	
2007–08	Texas–Arlington	21–12	7–9	T–3rd (West)	NCAA Division I Round of 64
2008–09	Texas–Arlington	16–14	9–7	3rd (West)	
2009–10	Texas–Arlington	16–14	8–8	T–3rd (West)	
2010–11	Texas–Arlington	13–16	7–9	T–3rd (West)	
2011–12	Texas–Arlington	24–9	15–1	1st (West)	NIT First Round
Texas–Arlington Mavericks (Western Athletic Conference) (2012–2013)
2012–13	Texas–Arlington	19–14	11–7	T–4th	CIT First Round
Texas–Arlington/UT Arlington Mavericks (Sun Belt Conference) (2013–2018)
2013–14	Texas–Arlington	15–17	9–9	T–5th	
2014–15	UT Arlington	16–15	10–10	5th	
2015–16	UT Arlington	24–11	13–7	3rd	CIT Quarterfinals
2016–17	UT Arlington	27–9	14–4	1st	NIT Quarterfinals
2017–18	UT Arlington	21–13	10–8	4th	
UT-Arlington:		225–161 (.583)	121–87 (.582)		
Troy Trojans (Sun Belt Conference) (2019–2026)
2019–20	Troy	9–22	5–15	T–11th	
2020–21	Troy	11–17	4–12	6th (East)	
2021–22	Troy	20–12	10–6	4th	CBI First Round
2022–23	Troy	20–13	11–7	T–5th	
2023–24	Troy	20–12	13–5	3rd	
2024–25	Troy	23–11	13–5	T–1st	NCAA Division I Round of 64
2025–26	Troy	22–12	12–6	1st	NCAA Division I Round of 64
Troy:		125–99 (.558)	68–56 (.548)		
Georgia Tech Yellow Jackets (Atlantic Coast Conference) (2026–present)
2026–27	Georgia Tech	5–1	0–0		
Georgia Tech:		5–1 (.833)	0–0 (–)		
Total:		355–261 (.576)			
National champion Postseason invitational champion Conference regular season champion Conference regular season and conference tournament champion Division regular season champion Division regular season and conference tournament champion Conference tournament champion

== Personal life ==
Cross is married to Jennifer Harris, who played volleyball at UT Arlington from 1995 to 1998. They have three children.
