= 2008 Southland Conference men's basketball tournament =

- Classification: Division I
- Season: 2007–08
- Teams: 8
- Site: Merrell Center; Katy, Texas
- Champions: Texas–Arlington (1st title)
- Winning coach: Scott Cross (1st title)
- MVP: Anthony Vereen (Texas–Arlington)

2007–08 Southland Conference men's basketball standings
	Conf.				Overall
Team	W		L	PCT	W		L	PCT
East
Lamar	13	–	3	.813	19	–	11	.633
Southeastern Louisiana	9	–	7	.563	17	–	13	.567
Northwestern State	9	–	7	.563	15	–	18	.455
McNeese State	7	–	9	.438	13	–	16	.448
Nicholls State	5	–	11	.313	10	–	21	.323
Central Arkansas	4	–	12	.250	14	–	16	.467
West
Stephen F. Austin	13	–	3	.813	26	–	6	.813
Sam Houston State	10	–	6	.625	23	–	8	.742
Texas–Arlington †	7	–	9	.438	21	–	12	.636
UTSA	7	–	9	.438	13	–	17	.433
Texas State	6	–	10	.375	13	–	16	.448
Texas A&M–Corpus Christi	6	–	10	.375	9	–	20	.310
† 2008 Southland tournament winner Rankings from AP poll

The 2008 Southland Conference men's basketball tournament took place March 13–16, 2008, at Merrell Center in Katy, Texas.

== Format ==
The top eight eligible men's basketball teams in the Southland Conference receive a berth in the conference tournament. After the conference season, teams are seeded by conference record.

== Bracket ==
Quarterfinals; March 13
2	Lamar	75
7	Texas–Arlington	81
3	Sam Houston State	64
6	McNeese State	62
1	Stephen F. Austin	71
8	UTSA	60
4	Southeastern Louisiana	51
5	Northwestern State	71

Semifinals; March 14
7	Texas–Arlington	72
3	Sam Houston State	66
1	Stephen F. Austin	66
5	Northwestern State	69

Finals; March 16
7	Texas–Arlington	82
5	Northwestern State	79

== Sources ==
- 2008 Tournament Bracket
