= 2017–18 UT Arlington Mavericks men's basketball team =

American college basketball season

2017–18 UT Arlington Mavericks men's basketball
- Conference: Sun Belt Conference
- Record: 21–13 (10–8 Sun Belt)
- Head coach: Scott Cross (12th season)
- Assistant coaches: Greg Young; Zak Buncik; Kenneth Mangrum
- Home arena: College Park Center

2017–18 Sun Belt Conference men's basketball standings
	Conf.				Overall
Team	W		L	PCT	W		L	PCT
Louisiana	16	–	2	.889	27	–	7	.794
Georgia State †	12	–	6	.667	24	–	11	.686
Georgia Southern	11	–	7	.611	21	–	12	.636
Texas–Arlington	10	–	8	.556	21	–	13	.618
Louisiana–Monroe	9	–	9	.500	16	–	16	.500
Troy	9	–	9	.500	16	–	17	.485
Appalachian State	9	–	9	.500	15	–	18	.455
Coastal Carolina	8	–	10	.444	14	–	18	.438
South Alabama	7	–	11	.389	14	–	18	.438
Texas State	7	–	11	.389	15	–	18	.455
Arkansas State	6	–	12	.333	11	–	21	.344
Little Rock	4	–	14	.222	7	–	25	.219
† 2018 Sun Belt Conference tournament winner

The 2017–18 UT Arlington Mavericks men's basketball team represented the University of Texas at Arlington during the 2017–18 NCAA Division I men's basketball season. The Mavericks, led by 12th-year head coach Scott Cross, played their home games at the College Park Center as members of the Sun Belt Conference. They finished the season 21–13, 10–8 in Sun Belt play to finish in fourth place. They defeated Appalachian State and Louisiana to advance to the championship game of the Sun Belt tournament where they lost to Georgia State. Despite having 21 wins, they did not participate in a postseason tournament.

On March 26, 2018, Cross was fired after 12 seasons at UT Arlington, along with his entire staff, with UTA's Athletic Director citing a change in the program's leadership. On April 6, the school hired former Texas Tech assistant Chris Ogden as head coach.

== Previous season ==
The Mavericks finished the 2016–17 season 27–9, 14–4 in Sun Belt play to win the Sun Belt regular season championship. In the Sun Belt tournament, they defeated Coastal Carolina before losing in the semifinals to Texas State. As a regular season conference champion who failed to win their conference tournament, they received an automatic bid to the National Invitation Tournament. There they defeated BYU and Akron before losing in the quarterfinals to Cal State Bakersfield.

== Offseason ==
Incoming transfers
Name	Position	Height	Weight	Year	Hometown	Previous school
Deon Barrett	G	5'10" (1.78 m)	150 lb (68 kg)	Sophomore	Lancaster, Texas	Lancaster H.S. Transferred from UTEP
Edric Dennis	G	6'3" (1.91 m)	188 lb (85 kg)	Junior	Dallas, Texas	Desoto H.S. Transferred from Jackson State

Under NCAA transfer rules, Barrett and Dennis will have to sit out for the 2017–18 season. Barrett will have three seasons of eligibility remaining, while Dennis will have two seasons.

== Roster ==
2017–18 Texas–Arlington Mavericks men's basketball team
Players
Coaches

Pos.	#	Name	Height	Weight	Year	Previous school	Hometown
G	1	Erick Neal	5 ft 10 in (1.78 m)	155 lb (70 kg)	Sr	Lincoln H.S.	Dallas, Texas
G	2	D. J. Bryant	5 ft 11 in (1.8 m)	180 lb (82 kg)	So	Riverview H.S.	Sarasota, Florida
G	3	Nathan Hawkins	6 ft 5 in (1.96 m)	205 lb (93 kg)	Sr	Rowlett H.S. Nebraska	Garland, Texas
G	4	Davion Turner	6 ft 9 in (2.06 m)	185 lb (84 kg)	Jr	Cedar Hill H.S. Hill College	Cedar Hill, Texas
G	5	Kaelon Wilson	6 ft 2 in (1.88 m)	192 lb (87 kg)	Jr	Lancaster H.S.	Lancaster, Texas
C	13	Johnny Hamilton	7 ft 0 in (2.13 m)	230 lb (104 kg)	GS	Virginia Tech	Rio Claro, Trinidad and Tobago
F	15	Scott Muirhead	6 ft 3 in (1.91 m)	206 lb (93 kg)	RS So	Ennis H.S.	Ennis, Texas
F	20	Julian Harris	6 ft 5 in (1.96 m)	235 lb (107 kg)	Sr	Lake Ridge H.S.	Mansfield, Texas
G	21	Pedro Castro	6 ft 6 in (1.98 m)	170 lb (77 kg)	Fr	Brewer H.S.	Fort Worth, Texas
C	22	Link Kabadyundi	7 ft 1 in (2.16 m)	274 lb (124 kg)	Sr	Alma Academy; TCU; Blinn College	Montreal, Quebec
G	23	Mairega Clarke	6 ft 5 in (1.96 m)	184 lb (83 kg)	Sr	Holy Cross H.S. Carl Albert State College	Queens, New York
F	25	Kevin Hervey	6 ft 9 in (2.06 m)	230 lb (104 kg)	Sr	Bowie H.S.	Arlington, Texas
G	30	Patrick Binzer	6 ft 2 in (1.88 m)	183 lb (83 kg)	Jr	Weatherford Christian School	Weatherford, Texas
F	34	Tim Holland	6 ft 8 in (2.03 m)	220 lb (100 kg)	Fr	Cedar Ridge H.S.	Round Rock, Texas
F	44	Nils Huizenga	6 ft 7 in (2.01 m)	210 lb (95 kg)	Fr	Byron Nelson H.S.	Trophy Club, Texas

Head coach

- Scott Cross (Texas–Arlington)

Assistant coach(es)

- Greg Young (Howard Payne)
- Zak Buncik (Texas–Arlington)
- Kenneth Mangrum (North Texas)

Legend

- (C) Team captain
- (S) Suspended
- (I) Ineligible
- (W) Walk-on
- Injured
- Current redshirt

Roster

== Schedule and results ==
Date time, TV	Rank^{#}	Opponent^{#}	Result	Record	High points	High rebounds	High assists	Site (attendance) city, state
Exhibition
Oct 28, 2017*; 12:00 pm		at Oklahoma; Charity Exhibition for Hurricane Harvey Recovery	W 99–84	—	27 – Hervey	13 – Hervey	12 – Neal	Lloyd Noble Center; Norman, OK
Non-conference regular season
Nov 11, 2017*; 7:00 pm, ESPN3		Loyola Marymount; Homecoming	W 85–80	1–0	28 – Hervey	8 – Hervey	11 – Neal	College Park Center (4,379); Arlington, TX
Nov 18, 2017*; 8:30 pm, BYUtv/ESPN3		at BYU; Barclays Center Classic	W 89–75	2–0	23 – Hervey	9 – Hervey	10 – Neal	Marriott Center (13,636); Provo, UT
Nov 21, 2017*; 8:00 pm, SECN		at No. 25 Alabama; Barclays Center Classic	L 76–77	2–1	24 – Hervey	6 – Tied	12 – Neal	Coleman Coliseum (11,737); Tuscaloosa, AL
Nov 24, 2017*; 6:00 pm		vs. Western Carolina; Barclays Center Classic	W 89–65	3–1	30 – Hamilton	15 – Hamilton	10 – Neal	Gallagher Center (842); Lewiston, NY
Nov 25, 2017*; 6:00 pm		vs. Niagara; Barclays Center Classic	W 95–90	4–1	27 – Hervey	10 – Tied	15 – Neal	Gallagher Center (809); Lewiston, NY
Nov 27, 2017*; 7:00 pm, ESPN3		UT Dallas	W 73–53	5–1	20 – Hamilton	12 – Hamilton	13 – Neal	College Park Center (1,694); Arlington, TX
Nov 29, 2017*; 7:00 pm, ESPN3		Rice	W 69–49	6–1	29 – Hervey	11 – Hervey	8 – Neal	College Park Center (1,649); Arlington, TX
Dec 2, 2017*; 7:00 pm, ESPN3		North Texas	W 65–60	7–1	23 – Hervey	9 – Hamilton	3 – Neal	College Park Center (2,728); Arlington, TX
Dec 7, 2017*; 7:00 pm, ESPN3		at Northern Iowa	L 58–62	7–2	17 – Hervey	15 – Hamilton	7 – Neal	McLeod Center (3,630); Cedar Falls, IA
Dec 9, 2017*; 2:00 pm, ESPN3		Florida Gulf Coast	L 78–85	7–3	25 – Hervey	10 – Hervey	5 – Neal	College Park Center (2,635); Arlington, TX
Dec 16, 2017*; 7:00 pm		at UT Rio Grande Valley	W 86–65	8–3	30 – Hervey	16 – Hervey	8 – Bryant	UTRGV Fieldhouse (774); Edinburg, TX
Dec 18, 2017*; 7:00 pm, FS1		at No. 25 Creighton	L 81–90	8–4	24 – Hervey	11 – Hervey	8 – Neal	CenturyLink Center Omaha (15,564); Omaha, NE
Dec 21, 2017*; 7:00 pm, ESPN3		Cal Poly	W 77–56	9–4	25 – Hervey	10 – Hervey	7 – Neal	College Park Center; Arlington, TX
Sun Belt Conference regular season
Dec 29, 2017; 7:30 pm		at Coastal Carolina	L 65–90	9–5 (0–1)	17 – Wilson	9 – Hamilton	6 – Neal	HTC Center (1,223); Conway, SC
Dec 31, 2017; 1:30 pm		at Appalachian State	L 76–80	9–6 (0–2)	27 – Neal	8 – Tied	3 – Neal	Holmes Center (891); Boone, NC
Jan 4, 2018; 7:15 pm, ESPN3		Troy	W 86–76	10–6 (1–2)	21 – Neal	10 – Wilson	7 – Neal	College Park Center (1,868); Arlington, TX
Jan 6, 2018; 4:15 pm, ESPN3		South Alabama	W 91–67	11–6 (2–2)	19 – Wilson	12 – Hamilton	5 – Neal	College Park Center (1,914); Arlington, TX
Jan 11, 2018; 7:00 pm, l		at Little Rock	L 65–77	11–7 (2–3)	21 – Hervey	11 – Hamilton	5 – Neal	Jack Stephens Center (2,091); Little Rock, AR
Jan 13, 2018; 7:00 pm		at Arkansas State	W 97–71	12–7 (3–3)	19 – Hamilton	8 – Hamilton	7 – Hawkins	First National Bank Arena (2,461); Jonesboro, AR
Jan 18, 2018; 7:15 pm, ESPN3		Louisiana	L 65–77	12–8 (3–4)	25 – Hervey	9 – Hervey	4 – Neal	College Park Center (2,384); Arlington, TX
Jan 20, 2018; 4:15 pm, ESPN3		Louisiana–Monroe	W 71–55	13–8 (4–4)	21 – Hervey	11 – Hamilton	8 – Neal	College Park Center (2,138); Arlington, TX
Jan 25, 2018; 6:15 pm, ESPN3		at Georgia State	L 75–81	13–9 (4–5)	22 – Hervey	13 – Hervey	8 – Neal	GSU Sports Arena (1,567); Atlanta, GA
Jan 27, 2017; 4:00 pm, ESPN3		at Georgia Southern	L 59–74	13–10 (4–6)	29 – Hervey	11 – Kabadyundi	4 – Neal	Hanner Fieldhouse (2,511); Statesboro, GA
Feb 1, 2017; 7:15 pm, ESPN3		Appalachian State	W 89–77	14–10 (5–6)	38 – Neal	14 – Hervey	6 – Neal	College Park Center (2,330); Arlington, TX
Feb 3, 2018; 4:15 pm, ESPN3		Coastal Carolina	W 87–80	15–10 (6–6)	20 – Tied	13 – Hamilton	6 – Hawkins	College Park Center (2,011); Arlington, TX
Feb 10, 2018; 4:15 pm, ESPN3		Texas State	W 70–68 ^{OT}	16–10 (7–6)	33 – Hervey	12 – Hamilton	5 – Neal	College Park Center (2,602); Arlington, TX
Feb 15, 2018; 7:00 pm		at Louisiana–Monroe	L 71–84	16–11 (7–7)	35 – Neal	6 – Hamilton	5 – Hervey	Fant–Ewing Coliseum (1,439); Monroe, LA
Feb 17, 2018; 7:00 pm, ESPN3		Louisiana	L 79–100	16–12 (7–8)	26 – Neal	9 – Hervey	4 – Neal	Cajundome (5,104); Lafayette, LA
Feb 22, 2017; 7:00 pm, ESPN3		Georgia Southern	W 83–63	17–12 (8–8)	23 – Wilson	9 – Hervey	8 – Neal	College Park Center (2,099); Arlington, TX
Feb 24, 2018; 4:15 pm, ESPN3		Georgia State	W 89–81	18–12 (9–8)	24 – Neal	12 – Hervey	7 – Neal	College Park Center (2,803); Arlington, TX
Mar 2, 2018; 6:00 pm, ESPN2		Texas State	W 85–82	19–12 (10–8)	22 – Tied	11 – Hamilton	10 – Neal	Strahan Coliseum (3,356); San Marcos, TX
Sun Belt tournament
Mar 9, 2018; 2:00 pm, ESPN3	(4)	vs. (5) Appalachian State; Quarterfinals	W 84–68	20–12	37 – Neal	9 – Hamilton	3 – Tied	Lakefront Arena; New Orleans, LA
Mar 10, 2018; 11:30 am, ESPN3	(4)	vs. (1) Louisiana; Semifinals	W 71–68	21–12	18 – Neal	11 – Hervey	5 – Neal	Lakefront Arena; New Orleans, LA
Mar 11, 2018; 1:00 pm, ESPN2	(4)	vs. (2) Georgia State; Championship	L 61–74	21–13	23 – Hamilton	14 – Hamilton	3 – Neal	Lakefront Arena; New Orleans, LA
*Non-conference game. ^{#}Rankings from AP Poll. (#) Tournament seedings in parentheses. All times are in Central Time.
