= South Hills High School (Texas) =

Location
- 6101 McCart; Fort Worth, Texas 76133; United States; 32°39′27″N 97°21′32″W

Information
- School type: Public secondary
- School district: Fort Worth Independent School District
- NCES School ID: 481970008026
- Principal: Rodrigo Durbin
- Teaching staff: 119.48 (FTE)
- Grades: 9-12
- Enrollment: 1,876 (2023–2024)
- Student to teacher ratio: 15.70
- Colors: Black & White
- Nickname: Scorpions
- Website: southhills.fwisd.org

South Hills High School is a 9-12 public high school in Fort Worth, Texas, United States. It is one of 14 zoned high schools in the Fort Worth Independent School District.

== History ==
South Hills opened in August 1998 with only a freshman class. The first graduating class, and the first year of 9-12 was 2002. The original school consisted of buildings and property purchased from a private school, Trinity Valley School. Roughly 50 portable classrooms and the original Trinity Valley structures were used until a bond issue in 2000 allowed the school as it is now to be constructed.

In 2019, FWISD proposed rezoning all of Rosemont to South Hills.

== Attendance zone ==
- Rosemont Middle School
- Segments of attendance zone of Wedgewood Middle School

== Demographics ==
Demographic breakdown of the 1,537 students enrolled for the 2012–2013 school year:

- Male - 51.0%
- Female - 49.0%
- Native American/Alaskan - 0.7%
- Asian/Pacific islanders - 3.8%
- Black - 9.2%
- Hispanic - 80.5%
- White - 5.5%
- Multiracial - 0.3%

Additionally, 75.5% of the students were eligible for free or reduced price lunch. NCES

In 2023 enrollment numbers totaled 1880 students.

== Athletics ==
The South Hills Scorpions offer the following sports:

- Baseball
- Basketball (boys & girls)
- Cross country (boys & girls)
- Flag Football (girls)
- Football
- Golf (boys & girls)
- Powerlifting (boys & girls)
- Soccer (boys & girls)
- Softball
- Tennis (boys & girls)
- Track (boys & girls)
- Volleyball (girls)
- Wrestling (boys & girls)

== Notable alumni ==
- Brandon Edwards — professional basketball player
- Brandon Williams — former NFL player
- Tylan Wallace — NFL wide receiver
