= Brandon Williams (linebacker) =

American football player (born 1988)

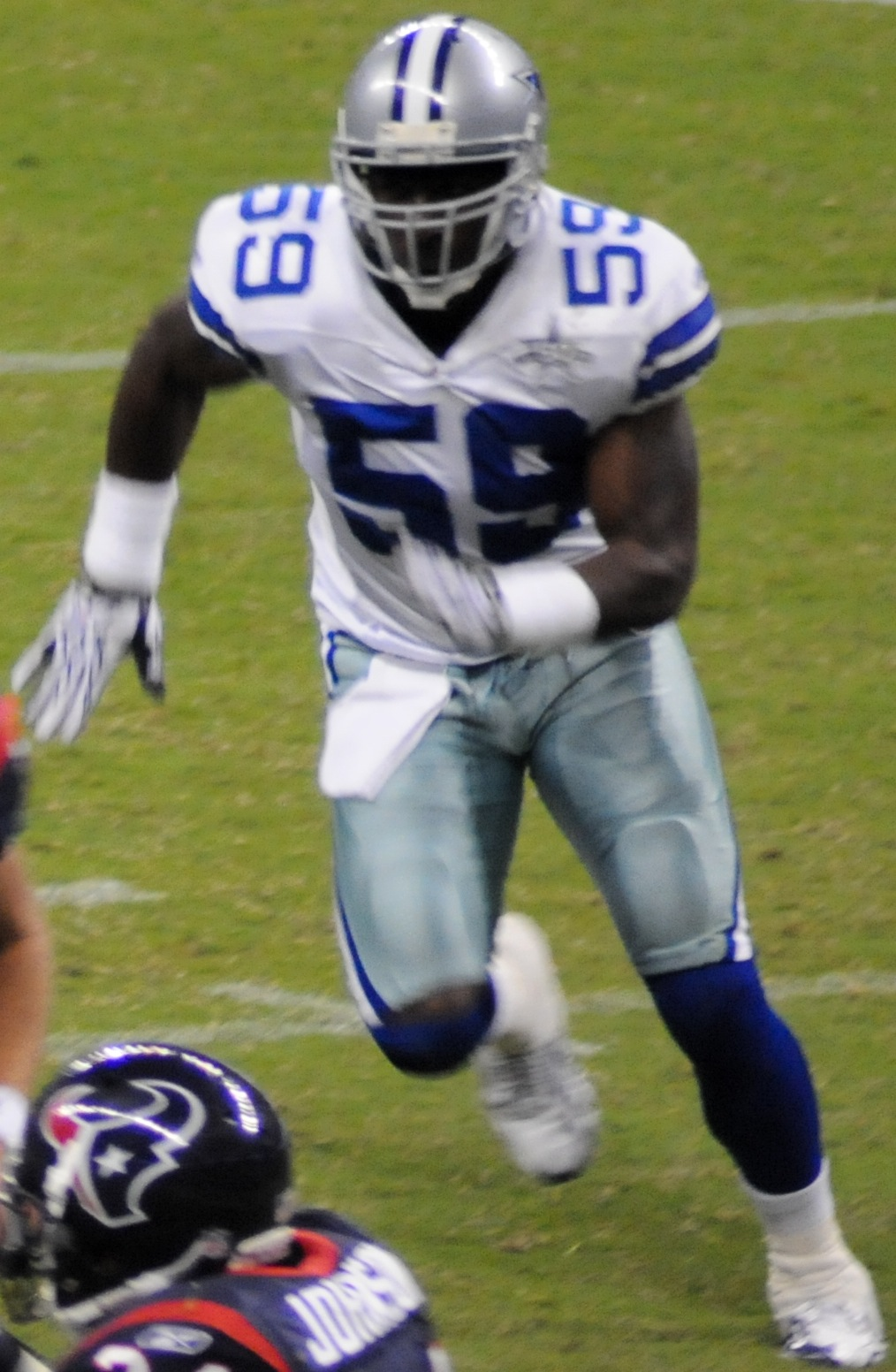
- Williams in a preseason game against the Houston Texans in 2010

No. 59
- Position: Linebacker

Personal information
- Born: June 21, 1988 (age 38); Fort Worth, Texas, U.S.
- Listed height: 6 ft 2 in (1.88 m)
- Listed weight: 254 lb (115 kg)

Career information
- High school: South Hills (Fort Worth)
- College: Texas Tech
- NFL draft: 2009: 4th round, 120th overall pick

Career history

Playing
- Dallas Cowboys (2009−2010); Arizona Cardinals (2011–2012)

Coaching
- Texas Stealth (2016) Head coach

Awards and highlights
- First-team All-Big 12 (2008); Second-team All-Big 12 (2007)

Career NFL statistics
- Games played: 6
- Total tackles: 4
- Stats at Pro Football Reference

Brandon Williams (born June 21, 1988) is an American former professional football player who was a linebacker in the National Football League (NFL). He played college football for the Texas Tech Red Raiders and was selected by the Dallas Cowboys in the fourth round of the 2009 NFL draft. He was also a member of the Arizona Cardinals.

== Early life ==
Williams attended South Hills High School. He received All-district (District 8-4A) honors as a senior, after registering 102 tackles and 11 sacks.

== College career ==
Williams accepted a football scholarship from Texas Tech University. As a true freshman, he appeared in 11 games as a backup defensive end, tallying 16 tackles and 3.5 sacks (third on the team). He had five tackles and 2 sacks against Southeastern Louisiana University.

As a sophomore, he became a starter at defensive end, leading the team with 6 sacks and 12.5 tackles for loss. He also had 41 tackles, 2 passes defensed, 3 forced fumble and one fumble recovery.

As a junior, he registered 11 sacks (led Big 12 Conference and tied for fourth in school history), 13 tackles for loss, 21 tackles, 3 passes defensed and one forced fumble. He made 4 tackles (3 for loss), 2 sacks and one forced fumble in the 2009 Cotton Bowl Classic against the University of Mississippi.

At the end of the season, he declared his intention to enter the 2009 NFL draft. At the same press conference when he announced his plans to forgo his senior season, he accompanied Texas Tech wide receiver Michael Crabtree, who made a similar announcement. He finished his college career with 78 tackles (29 for loss), 20.5 sacks (fourth in school history), 6 passes defensed, 6 forced fumbles and one fumble recovery.

== Professional career ==
Pre-draft measurables
Height	Weight	Arm length	Hand span	40-yard dash	10-yard split	20-yard split	20-yard shuttle	Three-cone drill	Vertical jump	Broad jump	Bench press	Wonderlic
6 ft 2 1/2 in (1.89 m)	261 lb (118 kg)	33 3/4 in (0.86 m)	9 5/8 in (0.24 m)	4.78 s	1.56 s	2.76 s	4.49 s	7.23 s	33.5 in (0.85 m)	9 ft 10 in (3.00 m)	18 reps	19
All values from NFL Combine/Texas Tech's Pro Day

=== Dallas Cowboys ===
Williams was selected by the Dallas Cowboys in the fourth round (120th overall) of the 2009 NFL draft, with the plan of converting him into an outside linebacker on their 3-4 defense. He tore his left ACL in the second preseason game while playing special teams and was placed on the injured reserve list on September 1.

In his second season, he played tentatively coming back from injury and was declared inactive in 10 games. He finished with four special teams tackles. He was waived on September 3, 2011.

=== Arizona Cardinals ===
The Arizona Cardinals signed him to their practice squad on November 22, 2011. He was promoted to the active roster on December 21. Williams was released with a shoulder injury on August 31, 2012.

== Coaching career ==
In 2016, he was the head coach of the Texas Stealth of American Indoor Football. He is a football coach at Nolan Catholic High School.
