= 2007–08 Texas–Arlington Mavericks men's basketball team =

American college basketball season

2007–08 Texas–Arlington Mavericks men's basketball

Southland tournament champions

NCAA tournament, first round
- Conference: Southland Conference
- West Division
- Record: 21–12 (7–9 Southland)
- Head coach: Scott Cross (2nd season)
- Assistant coaches: Greg Young; Derrick Daniels; Zak Buncik
- Home arena: Texas Hall

2007–08 Southland Conference men's basketball standings
	Conf.				Overall
Team	W		L	PCT	W		L	PCT
East
Lamar	13	–	3	.813	19	–	11	.633
Southeastern Louisiana	9	–	7	.563	17	–	13	.567
Northwestern State	9	–	7	.563	15	–	18	.455
McNeese State	7	–	9	.438	13	–	16	.448
Nicholls State	5	–	11	.313	10	–	21	.323
Central Arkansas	4	–	12	.250	14	–	16	.467
West
Stephen F. Austin	13	–	3	.813	26	–	6	.813
Sam Houston State	10	–	6	.625	23	–	8	.742
Texas–Arlington †	7	–	9	.438	21	–	12	.636
UTSA	7	–	9	.438	13	–	17	.433
Texas State	6	–	10	.375	13	–	16	.448
Texas A&M–Corpus Christi	6	–	10	.375	9	–	20	.310
† 2008 Southland tournament winner Rankings from AP poll

The 2007–08 Texas–Arlington Mavericks men's basketball team represented the University of Texas at Arlington during the 2007–08 NCAA Division I men's basketball season. The Mavericks, led by second year head coach Scott Cross, played their home games at Texas Hall and were members of the West Division of the Southland Conference. The Mavericks won the Southland Basketball tournament to receive an automatic bid into the NCAA tournament. As No. 16 seed in the South region, they lost in the first round to eventual National runner-up Memphis, 87–63.

== Roster ==
2007–08 Texas–Arlington Mavericks men's basketball team
Players
Coaches

Pos.	#	Name	Height	Weight	Year	Hometown
F	3	Jermaine Griffin	6 ft 9 in (2.06 m)	260 lb (118 kg)	Sr	Houston, Texas
G	23	Brandon Long	6 ft 1 in (1.85 m)	180 lb (82 kg)	Jr	Dallas, Texas
F	32	Anthony Vereen	6 ft 7 in (2.01 m)	245 lb (111 kg)	Jr	Houston, Texas

Head coach

- Scott Cross

Assistant coach(es)

Legend

- (C) Team captain
- (S) Suspended
- (I) Ineligible
- (W) Walk-on
- Injured
- Current redshirt

== Schedule and results ==
Date time, TV	Rank^{#}	Opponent^{#}	Result	Record	Site (attendance) city, state
Regular season
Nov 12, 2007*		UC Riverside	W 79–58	1–0	Texas Hall (1,045); Arlington, Texas
Nov 14, 2007*		Texas Southern	W 102–72	2–0	Texas Hall (449); Arlington, Texas
Nov 18, 2007*		at Arkansas-Little Rock	W 68–58	3–0	Jack Stephens Center (2,122); Little Rock, Arkansas
Nov 21, 2007*		North Texas	W 72–64	4–0	Texas Hall (1,289); Arlington, Texas
Nov 26, 2007*		Schreiner	W 99–66	5–0	Texas Hall (552); Arlington, Texas
Nov 29, 2007*		Texas Wesleyan	W 71–49	6–0	Texas Hall (382); Arlington, Texas
Dec 1, 2007*		Western Illinois	W 80–57	7–0	Texas Hall (513); Arlington, Texas
Dec 7, 2007*		at Wichita State	W 60–59	8–0	Charles Koch Arena (10,478); Wichita, Kansas
Dec 17, 2007*		at Texas Christian	L 74–77 ^{OT}	8–1	Daniel-Meyer Coliseum (3,890); Fort Worth, Texas
Dec 22, 2007*		at Oklahoma State	L 64–69	8–2	Gallagher-Iba Arena (9,799); Stillwater, Oklahoma
Dec 29, 2007*		Hardin-Simmons	W 74–54	9–2	Texas Hall (642); Arlington, Texas
Jan 2, 2008*		UT Permian Basin	W 85–59	10–2	Texas Hall (331); Arlington, Texas
Jan 5, 2008		at Northwestern State	L 82–86	10–3 (0–1)	Prather Coliseum (1,133); Natchitoches, Louisiana
Jan 10, 2008		at Central Arkansas	L 68–70 ^{OT}	10–4 (0–2)	Farris Center (2,453); Conway, Arkansas
Jan 17, 2008		Nicholls State	W 69–60	11–4 (1–2)	Texas Hall (826); Arlington, Texas
Jan 19, 2008		Southeastern Louisiana	W 73–67	12–4 (2–2)	Texas Hall (716); Arlington, Texas
Jan 23, 2008		UTSA	W 56–50	13–4 (3–2)	Texas Hall (824); Arlington, Texas
Jan 26, 2008		at Texas A&M-Corpus Christi	W 57–55	14–4 (4–2)	American Bank Center (2,047); Corpus Christi, Texas
Jan 30, 2008		at Sam Houston State	L 57–73	14–5 (4–3)	Johnson Coliseum (3,173); Huntsville, Texas
Feb 2, 2008		Stephen F. Austin	L 49–71	14–6 (4–4)	Texas Hall (1,342); Arlington, Texas
Feb 5, 2008*		Texas-Rio Grande Valley	W 71–68	15–6	Texas Hall (729); Arlington, Texas
Feb 9, 2008		Texas State	W 99–81	16–6 (5–4)	Texas Hall (587); Arlington, Texas
Feb 14, 2008		at Lamar	L 66–80	16–7 (5–5)	Montagne Center (3,286); Beaumont, Texas
Feb 16, 2008		McNeese State	L 69–74	16–8 (5–6)	Texas Hall (841); Arlington, Texas
Feb 20, 2008		at UTSA	L 72–80	16–9 (5–7)	Convocation Center (1,202); San Antonio, Texas
Feb 23, 2008		Texas A&M-Corpus Christi	W 82–69	17–9 (6–7)	Texas Hall (625); Arlington, Texas
Feb 27, 2008		Sam Houston State	L 65–79	17–10 (6–8)	Texas Hall (696); Arlington, Texas
Mar 1, 2008		at Stephen F. Austin	W 75–65	18–10 (7–8)	William R. Johnson Coliseum (3,013); Nacogdoches, Texas
Mar 8, 2008		at Texas State	L 86–97	18–11 (7–9)	Strahan Coliseum (1,458); San Marcos, Texas
Southland tournament
Mar 13, 2008*		vs. Lamar; Quarterfinals	W 81–75	19–11	Leonard E. Merrell Center (1,128); Katy, Texas
Mar 14, 2008*		vs. Sam Houston State; Semifinals	W 72–66	20–11	Leonard E. Merrell Center (1,659); Katy, Texas
Mar 16, 2008*		vs. Northwestern State; Championship Game	W 82–79	21–11	Leonard E. Merrell Center (1,006); Katy, Texas
NCAA tournament
Mar 21, 2008*	(16 S)	vs. (1 S) No. 2 Memphis; First Round	L 63–87	21–12	Alltel Arena (—); North Little Rock, Arkansas
*Non-conference game. ^{#}Rankings from AP Poll. (#) Tournament seedings in parentheses. S=South. All times are in Central Time.
