= Brandon Edwards =

American professional basketball player

Free agent
- Position: Power forward / center

Personal information
- Born: September 13, 1991 (age 35) Fort Worth, Texas
- Listed height: 6 ft 6 in (1.98 m)
- Listed weight: 225 lb (102 kg)

Career information
- High school: South Hills (Fort Worth, Texas)
- College: Texas–Arlington (2010–2014)
- NBA draft: 2014: undrafted
- Playing career: 2014–present

Career history
- 2014–2015: Breogán
- 2015–2016: Club Melilla
- 2016–2017: Rethymno Cretan Kings
- 2017: Vilpas Vikings
- 2017–2018: Hapoel Galil Elyon
- 2018–2019: Hapoel Ramat Gan Givatayim
- 2019: Elitzur Yavne
- 2019–2020: Macau Black Bears
- 2020–2021: BC Gries-Oberhoffen
- 2021–2022: Rouen Métropole Basket
- 2022–2023: Denain Voltaire Basket
- 2023–2024: Able Hon Friends
- 2024: Trepça
- 2024–2025: Terrafirma Dyip

Career highlights
- Kosovo Superleague champion (2024); Liga Unike champion (2024); Kosovo Cup (2024); Third-team All-Sun Belt (2014)

Brandon Lee Walton Edwards (born September 13, 1991) is an American professional basketball player who last played for the Terrafirma Dyip of the Philippine Basketball Association (PBA). He played college basketball for the University of Texas at Arlington before playing professionally in Spain, Greece, Finland, Israel, Macau and France.

== Early life and college career ==
Edwards is the son of Rhonda Edwards. He played high school basketball at South Hills High School in Fort Worth, Texas, where he averaged 22.5 points, 15.7 rebounds and 7.0 blocks per game as a senior and reached 209 career blocks. As a sophomore, he was named Second-team all-district. As a junior and senior, he was named First team all-district and Dallas Morning News District 7-4A Defensive Player of the Year.

After high school, Edwards played college basketball at the University of Texas at Arlington, with the Texas–Arlington Mavericks, from 2010 to 2014. In four years, he averaged 8.6 points, 6.8 rebounds, 1.0 blocks and 23.3 minutes per game, for a total of 126 games played. As a senior, he was named to the All-Sun Belt Conference third team and finished the season as the eighth-leading scorer in the conference (16.5), second-leading rebounder (9.8) and racked up a team-leading 14 double-doubles.

== Professional career ==
Edwards began his pro career in the 2014–15 season in Spain, with the LEB Oro club Breogán. In 35 games, he averaged 5.3 points, 2.7 rebounds, 0.3 blocks and 13.0 minutes per game, shooting 52.6 percent from the field and 31.0 percent from three-point.

He remained in Spain for the 2015–16 season but played for Club Melilla, with which he won the promotion to the Liga ACB, but Melilla refused it. In 41 games, he averaged 8.8 points, 6.1 rebounds, 0.7 assists and 23.3 minutes per game, shooting 64.6 percent from the field and 33.3 percent from three-point.

In June 2016, Edwards signed with the Greek club Rethymno Cretan Kings. In 14 games, he averaged 4.0 points, 3.7 rebounds, 0.4 blocks and 14.0 minutes per game, shooting 54.4 percent from the field and 9.1 percent from three-point.

In January 2017, he left the Greek league mid-season and signed with the Finnish club Vilpas Vikings of the Korisliiga. In 29 games, he averaged 9.6 points, 6.9 rebounds, 0.7 blocks and 19.0 minutes per game, shooting 67.9 percent from the field and 30.0 percent from three-point.

In August 2017, Edwards signed a one-year deal with the Israeli club Hapoel Galil Elyon of the Israeli National League. In 29 games, he averaged 20.1 points, 10.9 rebounds, 1.4 assists and 33.1 minutes per game, shooting 62.7 percent from the field and 30.0 percent from three-point.

In July 2018, Edwards signed with the Israeli club Hapoel Ramat Gan Givatayim of the Israeli National League for the 2018–19 season. In 14 games, he averaged 16.3 points, 11.7 rebounds, 1.6 blocks per game and 33.0 minutes per game, shooting 60.4 percent from the field.

In January 2019, Edwards parted ways with Ramat Gan and signed with the Israeli club Elitzur Yavne of the Israeli National League for the rest of the season, replacing Dallis Joyner. In 15 games, he averaged 16.1 points, 10.6 rebounds, 1.5 blocks and 31 minutes per game, shooting 61.1 percent from the field.

In August 2019, Edwards signed with the Macau Black Bears of the ABL as their second world import. On 15 July 2020, the league announced the cancellation of the season due to the COVID-19 pandemic outbreak and no league title was awarded. In the 2019–20 ABL season, Edwards played 12 games and averaged 18.0 points (shooting 66.3 percent from the field and 38.9 percent from three-point), 11.4 rebounds, 1.9 blocks and 36.0 minutes per game.

In July 2020, Edwards signed with the French club BC Gries-Oberhoffen of the LNB Pro B. Edwards and the BCGO participated in the Leaders Cup where they ended at the bottom of the D group, composed of 3 teams, with 1 win and 3 losses, thus, not qualifying for the next round. In 3 games, he averaged 7.3 points, 3.3 rebounds, 0.7 assists and 19.3 minutes per game.

In January 2024, Edwards signed for Trepça of the Kosovo Superleague and Liga Unike.

In July 2024, Edwards signed with the Terrafirma Dyip of the Philippine Basketball Association (PBA) as the team's import for the 2024 PBA Governors' Cup. However, he was replaced after suffering an ACL injury in a tune-up game prior to the conference. In December 2024, after recovering from an ACL injury, he comes back to Terrafirma to replace Ryan Richards.
