= Luigi Datome =

Italian basketball player (born 1987)

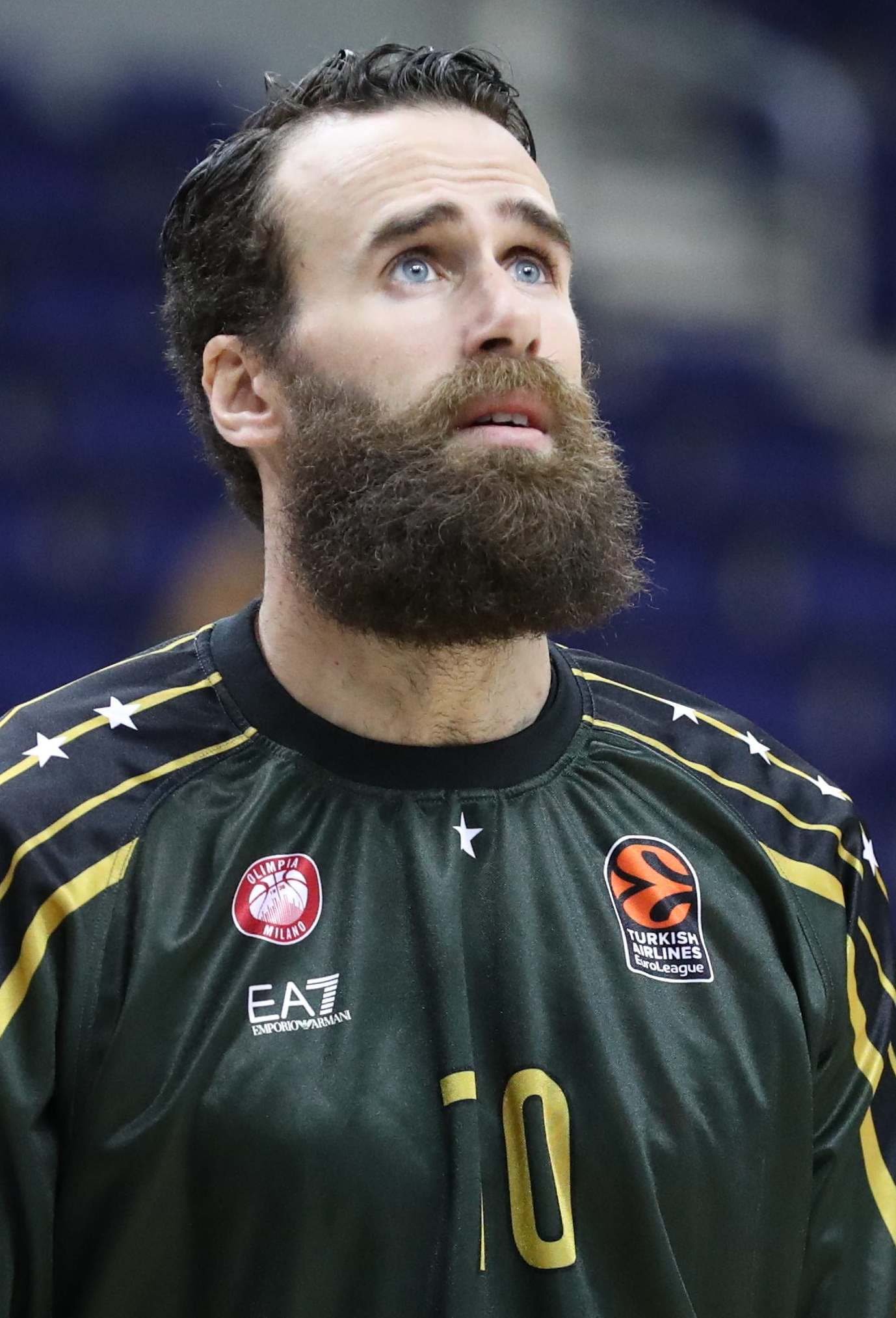
- Datome with Olimpia Milano in 2021

Personal information
- Born: 27 November 1987 (age 38) Montebelluna, Italy
- Listed height: 2.03 m (6 ft 8 in)
- Listed weight: 101 kg (223 lb)

Career information
- NBA draft: 2009: undrafted
- Playing career: 2003–2023
- Position: Small forward / power forward
- Number: 13, 70

Career history
- 2003–2007: Montepaschi Siena
- 2007–2008: Scafati
- 2008–2013: Virtus Roma
- 2013–2015: Detroit Pistons
- 2015: Boston Celtics
- 2015–2020: Fenerbahçe
- 2020–2023: Olimpia Milano

Career highlights
- 2× EuroLeague 50–40–90 club (2018, 2019); EuroLeague champion (2017); All-EuroLeague Second Team (2016); 3× LBA champion (2004, 2022, 2023); LBA MVP (2013); LBA Finals MVP (2023); All-LBA First Team (2013); LBA Best Player Under-22 (2009); LBA All-Star (2011); 2× Italian Cup winner (2021, 2022); Italian Cup MVP (2021); 3× TBSL champion (2016–2018); TBSL Finals MVP (2016); 3× Turkish Cup winner (2016, 2019, 2020); 2× Turkish Cup Final MVP (2019, 2020); 2× Turkish Super Cup winner (2016, 2017); Turkish Super Cup MVP (2017); TBSL All-Star (2018)

Career NBA statistics
- Points: 188 (3.4 ppg)
- Rebounds: 75 (1.4 rpg)
- Assists: 20 (0.4 apg)
- Stats at NBA.com
- Stats at Basketball Reference
Medals
Men's basketball
Representing Italy
European U-20 Championship
Bronze medal – third place	2007 Italy
European U-18 Championship
Bronze medal – third place	2005 Serbia and Montenegro

Luigi "Gigi" Datome (born 27 November 1987) is an Italian former professional basketball player. Standing at 2.03 m (6 ft 8 in), he played at the small forward and power forward positions. Datome was an All-EuroLeague Second Team selection in 2016.

== Professional career ==
=== Early years ===
Born in Montebelluna to Sardinian parents from Olbia, Datome moved to Olbia in Sardinia, where he started playing junior basketball. He joined Montepaschi Siena of the first division Serie A in 2003. He played three and a half seasons for Montepaschi before joining Scafati Basket in February 2007.

=== Virtus Roma (2008–2013) ===
In 2008, Datome signed with Virtus Roma where he went on to earn the league's Best Under 22 player award for the 2008–09 season. In 2012–13, he was named the Lega Basket Serie A MVP, after averaging 16.4 points and 5.6 rebounds per game.

=== Detroit Pistons (2013–2015) ===
On 16 July 2013, Datome signed a two-year, $3.5 million contract with the Detroit Pistons. On 23 December, he scored a season-high 13 points in a 115–92 win over the Cleveland Cavaliers.

On 14 January 2015, Datome was assigned by the Pistons to the Grand Rapids Drive of the NBA Development League. On 20 January, he was recalled by the Pistons.

=== Boston Celtics (2015) ===
On 19 February 2015, Datome was traded, along with Jonas Jerebko, to the Boston Celtics, in exchange for Tayshaun Prince. On 15 April, in the Celtics' final regular season game, he earned his first career NBA start; Datome responded with a career- and game-high 22 points, leading Boston to a narrow victory over the Milwaukee Bucks.

=== Fenerbahçe (2015–2020) ===
On 14 July 2015, Datome signed a two-year contract with the Turkish club Fenerbahçe. In his first season with the team, Datome won the Turkish Cup with a 67–65 win over Darüşşafaka. Fenerbahçe also reached the final game of the 2016 Euroleague Final Four, but fell short of winning the EuroLeague championship, after an overtime 96–101 loss to CSKA Moscow. Over 29 EuroLeague games, he averaged 12.4 points and 4.4 rebounds per game. At the end of the season, Fenerbahçe also won the Turkish League championship.

On 5 July 2017, Datome signed a three-year contract extension with Fenerbahçe. In 2017–18 EuroLeague, Fenerbahçe made it to the 2018 EuroLeague Final Four, its fourth consecutive Final Four appearance. Eventually, they lost to Real Madrid with 80–85 in the final game. Over 35 EuroLeague games, he averaged 9.6 points, 3.4 rebounds and 1.1 assists per game.

On 2 July 2019, Datome signed another contract extension with the Turkish club through the 2021–22 season. On 30 June 2020, Datome and the Turkish club parted ways after five quite successful seasons.

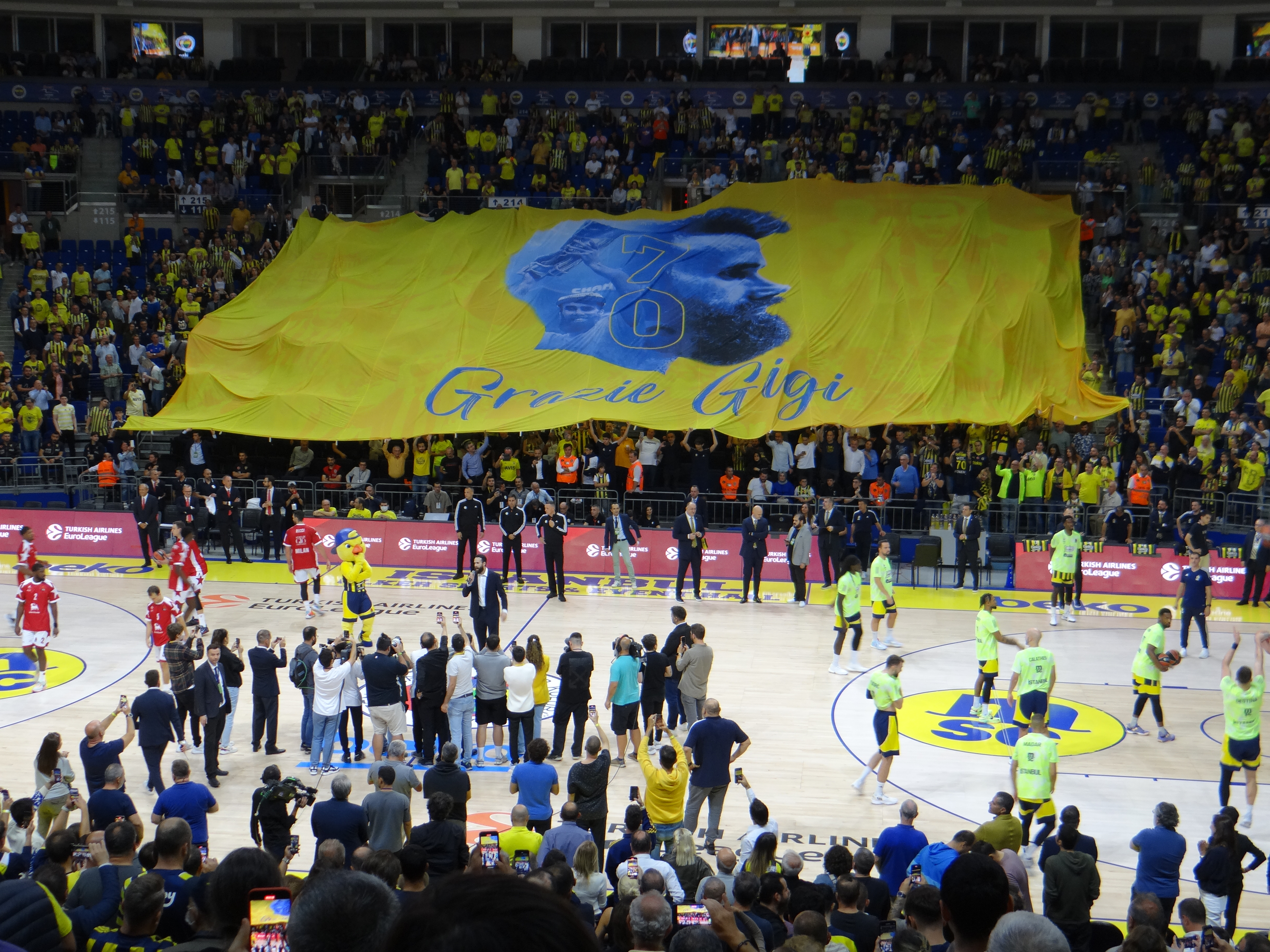
Datome's retirement ceremony during the 2023–24 EuroLeague game between Fenerbahce and Olimpia Milan.

=== Olimpia Milano (2020–2023) ===
On 30 June 2020, Datome signed with Olimpia Milano of the Lega Basket Serie A (LBA). On July 7, 2023, Datome announced his retirement from professional basketball after the 2023 FIBA World Cup. Subsequently, in October, Datome was inducted into the Olimpia Milano Hall of Fame along with six other players associated with the Armani era.

== Career statistics ==
Legend
GP	Games played	GS	Games started	MPG	Minutes per game
FG%	Field-goal percentage	3P%	3-point field-goal percentage	FT%	Free-throw percentage
RPG	Rebounds per game	APG	Assists per game	SPG	Steals per game
BPG	Blocks per game	PPG	Points per game	PIR	Performance index rating
**Bold**	Career high

=== NBA ===
==== Regular season ====
Year	Team	GP	GS	MPG	FG%	3P%	FT%	RPG	APG	SPG	BPG	PPG
2013–14	Detroit	**34**	0	7.0	.351	.179	.800	**1.4**	.3	.2	.0	2.4
2014–15	Detroit	3	0	5.7	.417	.250	.000	1.3	**.7**	**.3**	.0	3.7
2014–15	Boston	18	**1**	**10.7**	**.494**	**.472**	**1.000**	**1.4**	.4	.1	**.4**	**5.2**
Career		55	1	8.1	.414	.361	.818	1.4	.4	.1	.1	3.4

=== Playoffs ===
Year	Team	GP	GS	MPG	FG%	3P%	FT%	RPG	APG	SPG	BPG	PPG
2015	Boston	3	0	4.7	.333	.000	.000	.3	.3	.0	.0	1.3
Career		3	0	4.7	.333	.000	.000	.3	.3	.0	.0	1.3

=== EuroLeague ===
†	Denotes season in which Datome won the EuroLeague
*	Led the league

Year	Team	GP	GS	MPG	FG%	3P%	FT%	RPG	APG	SPG	BPG	PPG	PIR
2004–05	Mens Sana	6	0	5.5	**.583**	.000	—	1.3	.2	.3	—	2.3	2.5
2005–06	Mens Sana	11	2	11.2	.538	**.579**	**1.000**	2.3	.4	.7	.2	5.2	5.1
2008–09	Roma	13	2	16.8	.417	.348	.895	3.7	.6	.4	.3	5.8	5.8
2009–10	Roma	2	0	10.9	.400	.400	**1.000**	2.0	.5	—	—	6.0	4.5
2010–11	Roma	13	12	24.5	.438	.367	**1.000**	4.3	.7	**1.1**	.4	9.1	7.5
2015–16	Fenerbahçe	29	**23**	**27.0**	.516	.462	.867	**4.4**	**1.9**	.4	.3	**12.4**	**13.3**
2016–17†	Fenerbahçe	33	21	23.6	.442	.466	.944	3.7	1.1	.5	.1	9.2	8.8
2017–18	Fenerbahçe	35	15	23.9	.486	.444	.917	3.4	1.1	.4	**.6**	9.6	9.7
2018–19	Fenerbahçe	34	15	21.0	.477	.415	.917	3.6	.8	.5	.2	9.0	8.4
2019–20	Fenerbahçe	28*	15	22.4	.478	.431	.929	3.4	1.3	.8	.3	8.3	7.4
2020–21	Milano	**37**	7	16.5	.484	.511	.897	2.8	.8	.2	.1	7.1	6.4
2021–22	Milano	26	13	15.3	.442	.390	.867	1.4	.3	.5	.0	7.0	4.4
2022–23	Milano	6	1	9.3	.364	.417	**1.000**	.8	—	.2	—	3.7	1.7
Career		273	126	20.2	.473	.439	.908	3.2	.9	.5	.2	8.3	7.8

=== National team ===
Year	Competition	GP	GS	MPG	FG%	3P%	FT%	RPG	APG	SPG	BPG	PPG
2007	EuroBasket	1	0	6.0	.0	.0	.0	2.0	.0	0.0	.0	.0
2011	EuroBasket	4	0	4.5	.500	.333	.0	.8	.0	.0	.0	1.3
2013	EuroBasket	**11**	**11**	**31.2**	.470	**.429**	**.909**	**4.9**	**1.4**	**.8**	.5	13.8
2015	EuroBasket	2	2	16.5	.462	.200	.500	3.0	1.0	.0	.0	7.0
2017	EuroBasket	7	7	29.0	**.528**	.419	.867	4.3	1.1	.6	**.7**	**15.0**
Career		25	20	17.4	39.2	27.6	45.5	3	1.2	0.2	0.2	7.4

== National team career ==
Datome played with the senior men's Italian national team at the 2007 EuroBasket, the EuroBasket 2011, and the 2013 EuroBasket. He was also a part of the Italian squad that would take part in the 2015 EuroBasket. However, after injuring a muscle during Italy's second game of the tournament, against Iceland, Datome had to pull out of the rest of the tournament.

Datome also represented Italy at the 2016 Turin FIBA World Olympic Qualifying Tournament, and at the 2017 EuroBasket.

His last career game was also played for the national team in the 2023 FIBA World Cup. In the classification game, Italy lost to Slovenia, 85–89. Datome finished the game with 1 point.

== See also ==
- List of youngest EuroLeague players
