= Kevin Hervey =

American basketball player (born 1996)

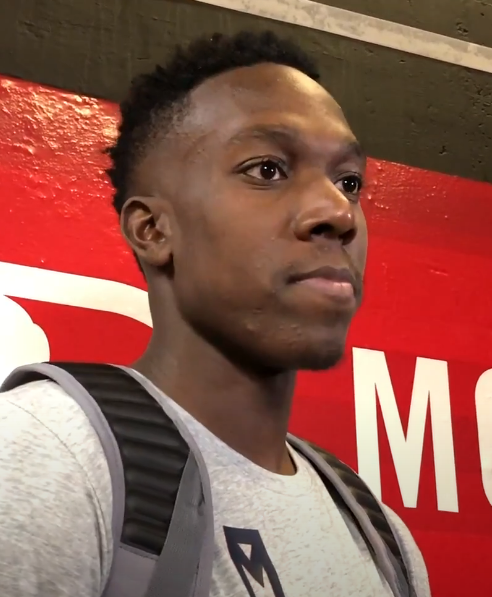

Free agent
- Position: Power forward

Personal information
- Born: July 9, 1996 (age 30) Dallas, Texas, U.S.
- Listed height: 2.03 m (6 ft 8 in)
- Listed weight: 104 kg (229 lb)

Career information
- High school: Bowie (Arlington, Texas)
- College: UT Arlington (2014–2018)
- NBA draft: 2018: 2nd round, 57th overall pick
- Drafted by: Oklahoma City Thunder
- Playing career: 2018–present

Career history
- 2018–2019: Oklahoma City Blue
- 2019–2020: Oklahoma City Thunder
- 2019–2020: →Oklahoma City Blue
- 2020–2021: Lokomotiv Kuban
- 2021–2022: Virtus Bologna
- 2023–2024: Reggio Emilia
- 2024: U-BT Cluj-Napoca

Career highlights
- EuroCup champion (2022); Italian Supercup winner (2021); AP Honorable Mention All-American (2017); Sun Belt Player of the Year (2017); 2× First-team All-Sun Belt (2017, 2018)
- Stats at NBA.com
- Stats at Basketball Reference

Kevin Hervey (born July 9, 1996) is an American professional basketball player, who most recently played for U-BT Cluj-Napoca of the Romanian Liga Națională de Baschet Masculin (LNBM) and the EuroCup. He played college basketball for the UT Arlington Mavericks.

== College career ==
Hervey came into UT Arlington at only 180 pounds before eventually reaching 210 pounds by his senior season. Hervey played four years for the Mavericks. In his sophomore season, Hervey averaged 18.1 points and 9.8 rebounds per game. He missed the last 19 games of the season due to a torn ACL in his left knee.

As a junior, Hervey averaged 17.1 points and 8.5 rebounds per game but had some lingering effects from the ACL tear in the early season. He led the Mavericks to a 27–9 season, the most wins in school history, and NIT quarterfinal run. He was named Sun Belt Conference Player of the Year and earned all-district honors from both the National Association of Basketball Coaches and the U.S. Basketball Writers Association. Hervey is the second Texas–Arlington player after Marquez Haynes to be named an AP Honorable Mention All-American. He was twice named Sun Belt Player of the Week, on December 6, 2016, and February 20, 2017.

As a senior, Hervey averaged 21.1 points and 8.7 rebounds per game. He was named to the first-team All-Sun Belt team for the second consecutive year.

== Professional career ==
=== Oklahoma City Blue (2018–2020) ===
Hervey was chosen with 57th pick in the 2018 NBA draft by the Oklahoma City Thunder. He became the fourth player from the University of Texas-Arlington to be selected in an NBA draft, with the last players being selected in 1982. Hervey averaged 7.2 points, 2.6 rebounds and one assist per game in five summer league games. On October 5, 2018, he was signed by the Thunder's G League affiliate Oklahoma City Blue.

=== Oklahoma City Thunder (2019–2020) ===
On December 12, 2019, the Oklahoma City Thunder announced that they had signed a two-way contract with Hervey. Throughout the contract, Hervey would split his playing time between the Oklahoma City Thunder and their NBA G League affiliate, the Oklahoma City Blue. In nine games, Hervey averaged 1.7 points and 1.2 rebounds per game for the Thunder.

=== Lokomotiv Kuban (2020–2021) ===
On September 20, 2020, Hervey signed a one-year deal with Lokomotiv Kuban of the VTB United League and the EuroCup.

=== Virtus Bologna (2021–2022) ===
On July 10, 2021, Hervey signed a two-years deal with Virtus Bologna of the Italian Lega Basket Serie A. On September 21, the team won its second Supercup, defeating Olimpia Milano 90–84. Moreover, after having ousted Lietkabelis, Ulm and Valencia in the first three rounds of the playoffs, on 11 May 2022, Virtus defeated Frutti Extra Bursaspor by 80–67 at the Segafredo Arena, winning its first EuroCup and qualifying for the EuroLeague after 14 years. However, despite having ended the regular season at the first place and having ousted 3–0 both Pesaro and Tortona in the first two rounds of playoffs, Virtus was defeated 4–2 in the national finals by Olimpia Milan.

=== Pallacanestro Reggiana (2023–2024) ===
On July 9, 2023, he signed with Pallacanestro Reggiana of the Italian Lega Basket Serie A (LBA).

=== U-BT Cluj-Napoca (2024) ===
On July 22, 2024, Hervey signed with U-BT Cluj-Napoca of the Liga Națională de Baschet Masculin. On November 8, he was released by Cluj.

== Career statistics ==
Legend
GP	Games played	GS	Games started	MPG	Minutes per game
FG%	Field goal percentage	3P%	3-point field goal percentage	FT%	Free throw percentage
RPG	Rebounds per game	APG	Assists per game	SPG	Steals per game
BPG	Blocks per game	PPG	Points per game	**Bold**	Career high

=== NBA ===
Year	Team	GP	GS	MPG	FG%	3P%	FT%	RPG	APG	SPG	BPG	PPG
2019–20	Oklahoma City	10	0	5.2	.259	.150	—	1.2	.5	.1	.1	1.7
Career		10	0	5.2	.259	.150	—	1.2	.5	.1	.1	1.7

=== College ===
Year	Team	GP	GS	MPG	FG%	3P%	FT%	RPG	APG	SPG	BPG	PPG
2014–15	UT Arlington	31	15	21.7	.368	.259	.714	6.0	.7	.6	.3	7.1
2015–16	UT Arlington	16	16	29.8	.453	.323	.757	**9.8**	**2.9**	.7	**.8**	18.1
2016–17	UT Arlington	**35**	**28**	27.8	**.459**	**.343**	.753	8.5	2.1	**1.2**	.4	17.1
2017–18	UT Arlington	33	25	**32.2**	.446	.339	**.807**	8.5	2.2	**1.2**	.6	**20.5**
Career		115	84	27.7	.440	.324	.768	8.0	1.9	1.0	.5	15.5
