= Johnny Hamilton (basketball) =

Trinidad and Tobago basketball player

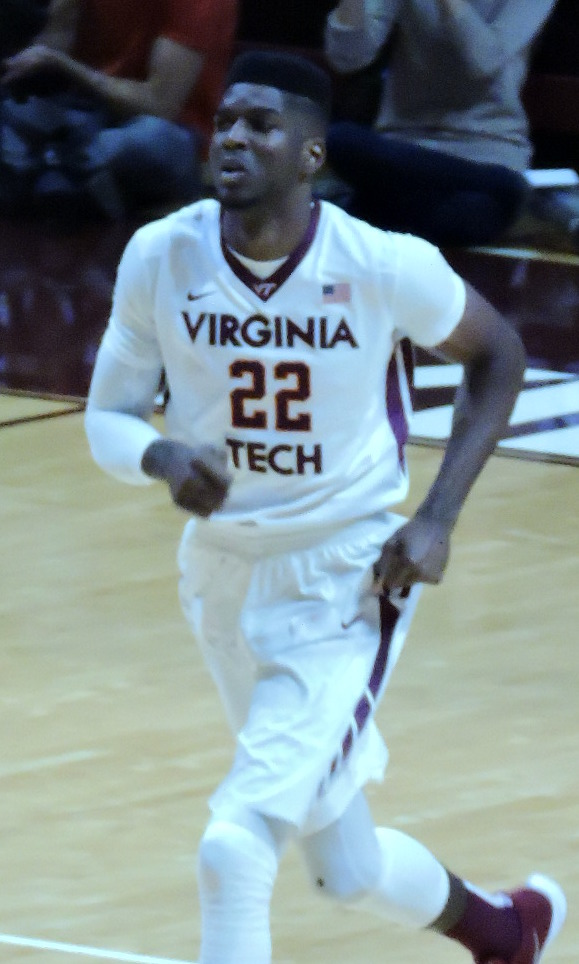
- Hamilton with Virginia Tech in 2015

No. 34 – Ostioneros de Guaymas
- Position: Center
- League: CIBACOPA

Personal information
- Born: February 3, 1994 (age 32) Rio Claro, Trinidad and Tobago
- Listed height: 7 ft 0 in (2.13 m)
- Listed weight: 230 lb (104 kg)

Career information
- College: Jacksonville College (2013–2015); Virginia Tech (2015–2017); UT Arlington (2017–2018)
- NBA draft: 2018: undrafted
- Playing career: 2018–present

Career history
- 2018–2019: Grand Rapids Drive
- 2019–2020: Darüşşafaka
- 2020–2021: Fenerbahçe
- 2021: →Mornar Bar
- 2021–2022: College Park Skyhawks
- 2022: Afyon Belediye
- 2022–2023: Merkezefendi Bld. Denizli Basket
- 2023–2024: Bursaspor
- 2024: Beirut Club
- 2024: Shahrdari Gorgan
- 2024–2025: Força Lleida
- 2026–present: Ostioneros de Guaymas
- Stats at NBA.com
- Stats at Basketball Reference

Johnathan Hamilton (born February 3, 1994) is a Trinidadian professional basketball player who last played for Força Lleida of the Liga ACB. He began his college career at Jacksonville College, before moving to NCAA Division I program Virginia Tech and playing his final season for UT Arlington. Standing 7 ft 0 in (2.13 m), he plays the center position.

== Early life ==
Hamilton was born in the rural town of Rio Claro, Trinidad and Tobago to Princess and Tony Hamilton. He has six siblings, named Joshua, Jesse, Jason, Anthony, Liz and Tia. His father played for a basketball club in Trinidad and Tobago. Hamilton played soccer in his childhood but switched to basketball at age 16 after growing too tall for the former sport. He has stated that he transferred his footwork skills from soccer to help him in basketball. While growing up, Hamilton also played cricket with his friends and swam in a river for fun. He began his basketball career with his local team, the Warriors, before joining the NBS Ambassadors in the Mayaro Basketball League.

== College career ==
Hamilton was encouraged to play college basketball in the United States by a pastor from Jacksonville, Texas who visited Trinidad and Tobago annually. As a result, he spent his freshman and sophomore seasons of college at Jacksonville College in the pastor's hometown. In 26 games in his second year, he averaged 9 points, 8.9 rebounds, and 4.3 blocks per game, shooting .617 from the field and ranking among the top shot-blockers in the National Junior College Athletic Association (NJCAA).

On April 22, 2015, Hamilton signed a letter of intent to play for Virginia Tech in the NCAA Division I. In December 2015, he was suspended by head coach Buzz Williams due to poor academic performance. Hamilton finished his junior season having played 17 games, averaging 1.8 points, 2.2 rebounds, and 0.9 blocks per game. Three games into his senior campaign for Virginia Tech, he suffered a season-ending thumb injury, after a tendon rupture was discovered in his left thumb. He was averaging 3.7 points, 1.3 rebounds, and 0.3 blocks per game.

Despite graduating from Virginia Tech with a bachelor's degree in criminology, Hamilton chose to attend the University of Texas at Arlington for graduate school, with the goal of becoming a police commissioner in Trinidad and Tobago. In his final year of college basketball eligibility, he played for the UT Arlington Mavericks, being drawn to the program by associate head coach Greg Young, who had helped recruit him to Jacksonville College. Hamilton averaged 11.2 points, 8.1 rebounds, and 2.3 blocks, starting in 31 of 34 games. He recorded a double-double of 23 points and 14 rebounds in a championship game loss at the 2018 Sun Belt Conference tournament, earning all-tournament team honors.

== Professional career ==
=== Grand Rapids Drive (2018–2019) ===
After going undrafted in the 2018 NBA draft, Hamilton played for the Detroit Pistons at the 2018 NBA Summer League. Through 3 games, he averaged 4 points, 4 rebounds, and 1.7 blocks in 12.7 minutes per game. Hamilton signed with the Detroit Pistons to a training camp contract but was waived on October 12, 2018.

=== Darüşşafaka (2019–2020) ===
On July 13, 2019, Hamilton signed with Darüşşafaka of the Turkish Basketball Super League. He averaged 9.8 points, 7.3 rebounds and 1.4 blocks for Darussafaka, over 40 games between BSL and EuroCup.

=== Fenerbahçe (2020–2021) ===
On July 10, 2020, Hamilton signed with Fenerbahçe Beko of the Turkish Basketball Super League and the EuroLeague.

On June 17, 2021, Hamilton was officially released from his contract with the Turkish club, following his loan spell.

==== Loan to Mornar Bar (2021) ====
On January 24, 2021, Hamilton was loaned to Mornar Bar of the ABA League and the Montenegrin League.

On September 22, 2021, Hamilton signed with the Atlanta Hawks, but was waived on October 15.

=== College Park Skyhawks (2021–2022) ===
In October 2021, Hamilton signed with the College Park Skyhawks. He averaged 6.1 points, 4.3 rebounds, and 1.2 blocks per game.

=== Afyon Belediye (2022) ===
On January 15, 2022, Hamilton signed with HDI Sigorta Afyon Belediye of the Basketbol Süper Ligi.

=== Merkezefendi Bld. Denizli Basket (2022–2023) ===
On November 9, 2022, he signed with Merkezefendi Bld. Denizli Basket of the Turkish Basketball Super League (BSL).

=== Bursaspor (2023–present) ===
On July 27, 2023, he signed with Bursaspor of the Turkish Basketbol Süper Ligi (BSL).
