= 2025 Cushman–Cave City tornado =

Long-track 2025 EF3 tornado across Arkansas, USA

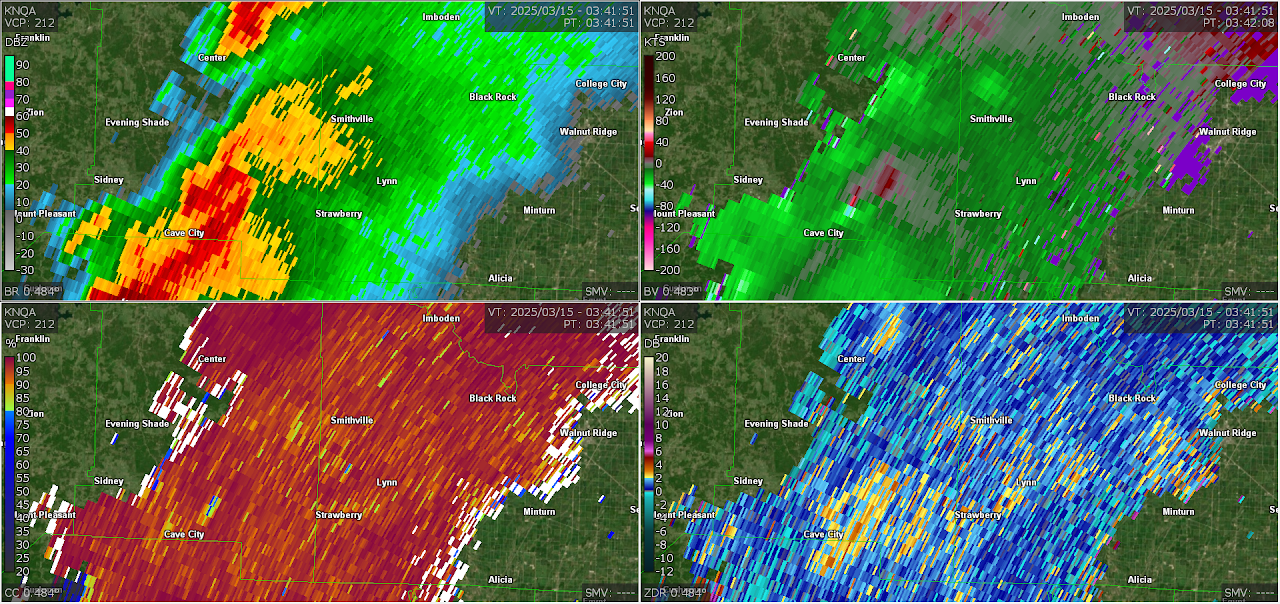
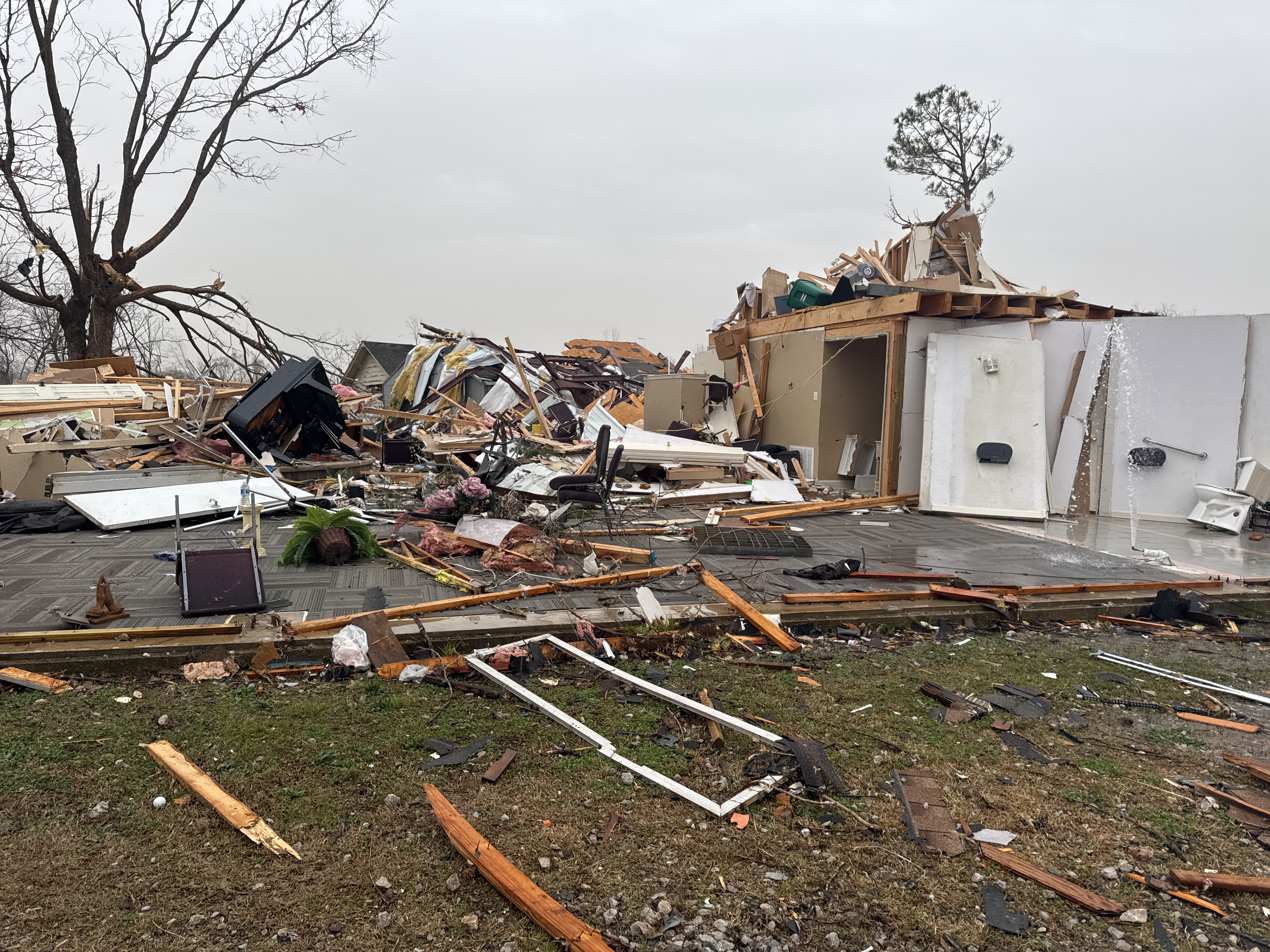
- Clockwise from the top: A photo of the tornado to its north from Cushman, a house destroyed at EF3 intensity in Cave City, a Next-Generation Radar scan of the tornado after exiting Cave City.

Meteorological history
- Formed: March 14, 2025, 10:16 PM CDT (UTC–05:00)
- Dissipated: March 14, 2025, 11:51 PM CDT (UTC–05:00)
- Duration: 1 hour, 35 minutes

EF3 tornado
- on the Enhanced Fujita scale
- Max width: 700 yd (0.40 mi; 0.64 km)
- Path length: 81.84 mi (131.71 km)
- Highest winds: 165 mph (266 km/h)

Overall effects
- Fatalities: 3
- Injuries: 20
- Damage: >$300,000 (2025 USD)
- Areas affected: Independence, Sharp, Lawrence, Randolph and Clay counties; specifically near Cushman, Cave City, Black Rock, Pocahontas and Reyno, Arkansas, United States
- Part of the Tornado outbreak of March 14–16, 2025 and Tornadoes of 2025

During the late evening hours of March 14, 2025, a long-lived and deadly tornado passed through sections of northern Arkansas in the Midsouthern United States. Rated EF3 on the Enhanced Fujita scale, it was one of many intense tornadoes that occurred during a massive and destructive tornado outbreak from March 14–16, which was the largest ever recorded for the month. In its wake, the tornado tracked from south of Cushman to Cave City, Black Rock, Pocahontas and Reyno before dissipating north of Corning, just over 1 mi (1.6 km) south of the Missouri state line.

Three people were killed, and approximately 20 people were injured by this long-track EF3 tornado in Independence County, all of them located in the vicinity of Cushman to its southeast. Cave City, located along the Independence–Sharp County border took the worst of the tornado's devastation, having been directly hit with numerous homes and businesses severely damaged or completely destroyed. The tornado also caused an extensive and widespread area of destruction throughout portions of southeastern Sharp County, to Lawrence, Randolph and Clay counties. It was one of two long-track tornadoes in northern Arkansas that night, with the other being an EF4 tornado that occurred to the west and crossed over into Ripley County, Missouri from northwestern Randolph County, Arkansas.

== Meteorological synopsis ==
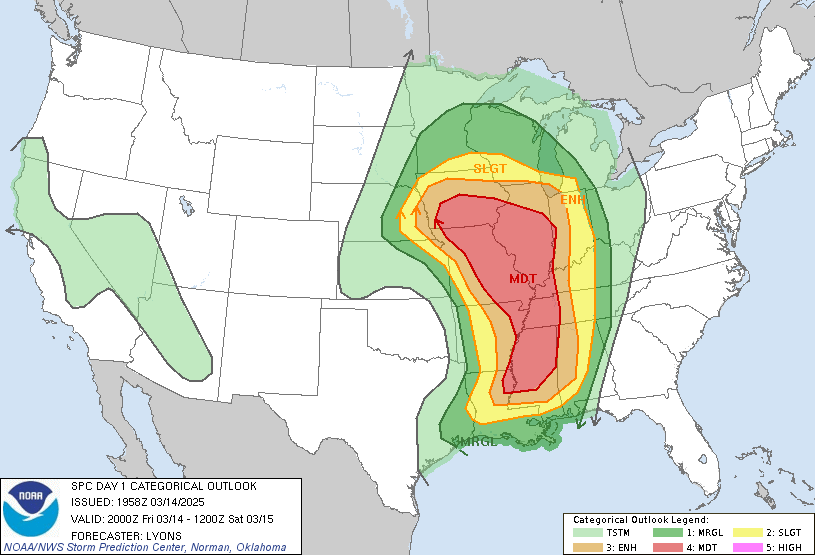
The SPC Day 1 convective outlook for March 14, 2025, at 20:00 UTC, showing the widespread risk of severe weather across the Mississippi Valley and Southeastern United States.

A strong negatively-tilted upper-level shortwave trough detected on satellite on morning of March 14 was expected to produce an intense mid-level jet that followed its parent shortwave and move towards the center of the continental United States. These features produced strong ascent, which, alongside a powerful surface cyclone expected to form and move from the central High Plains towards the Upper Midwest, produced the conditions necessary for the development of significant severe weather, necessitating the issue of a moderate risk for a large portion of the Mississippi Valley by the Storm Prediction Center. Over much of the middle Mississippi Valley, strong diurnal heating was expected to occur, which, alongside a low-level jet to aid boundary-level moisture, allowed for the development of surface-based storms, which were expected to produce a single fast-moving band of convection that was expected to produce gusts up to 80–100 mph (130–160 km/h) over the region.

Further to the southeast over Missouri, forecasters outlined the risk of more discrete thunderstorms developing on the northern edge of a more concentrated area of low-level moisture. These storms were expected to form into at least semi-discrete supercells due to the presence of strong upper-level flow and strong deep-layer shear. The HRRR model suggested that widespread supercells could develop late in the afternoon, potentially as far south as the border of Mississippi, Arkansas, and Tennessee, with soundings of other forecast models, including the NAM model, favoring the development of intense supercells capable of producing large hail of 2–3 in (5.1–7.6 cm) and potentially significant or intense tornadoes.

The first complex of storms had emerged by 10:25 a.m. Central Daylight Time (UTC–5) over southern Kansas and northeastern Oklahoma, which moved into a region of high atmospheric stability and strong convective inhibition, with a minimal severe hazard risk expected to be limited to small hail up to 1.25 in (3.2 cm). The Storm Prediction Center was expecting the formation of an intense squall line to initiate between 3 and 5 p.m. that afternoon. In the evening, a PDS tornado watch was issued for an area in the Mississippi Valley, with severe thunderstorms expected to develop in conditions primed for supercells capable of producing strong, long-track tornadoes. As forecast, numerous supercells began developing across the main risk area, and began producing tornadoes, some of which have presumably been strong to intense.

== Tornado summary ==
=== Beginning phases near Cushman ===
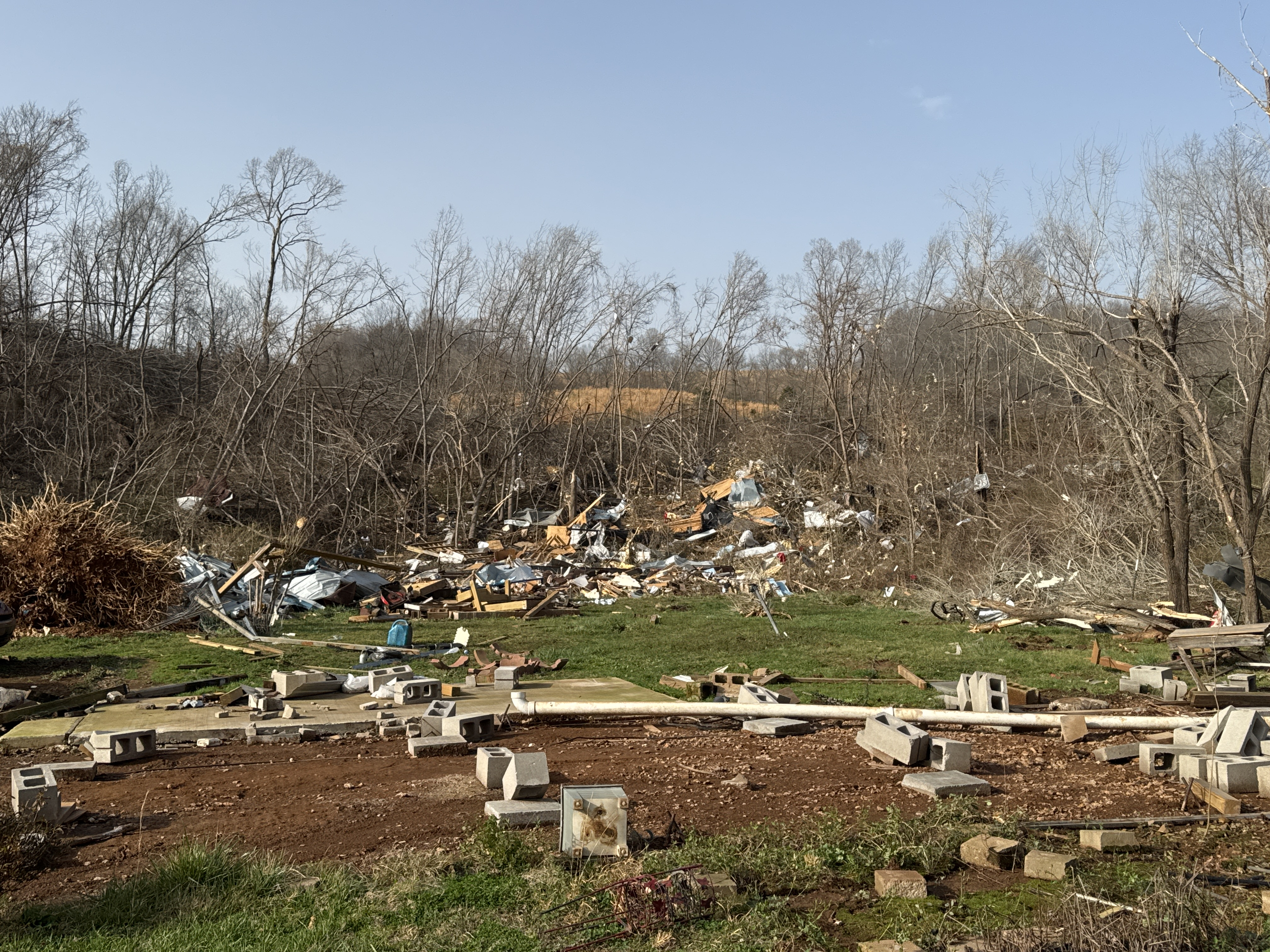
Low-end EF3 damage to a single-wide mobile home that was destroyed near Cushman. Two fatalities were recorded in the home.

At 10:16 PM CDT (UTC–03:16), the tornado touched down at EF0 intensity in northwestern Independence County, just southwest of Cushman. Seven minutes later at 10:23 PM CDT (UTC-03:23) a tornado warning was issued for portions of Independence, Izard and Sharp counties, which included Cushman. The tornado moved south of the city, crossing AR 69 at EF1 intensity before intensifying to EF2 strength along Claxton Loop. Many trees were snapped in this area, where as mobile and framed homes were heavily damaged or blown away. Up ahead on Claxton Loop, the tornado destroyed a split-level house and damaged groves of trees at EF2 intensity, resulting in the death of one person. Not far to the east, two people were killed in a mobile home which was struck at EF3 intensity and blown away. The tornado then weakened to EF2 intensity, but yet again obliterated a modular home away at significant strength. After crossing the road, the tornado would enter wooded areas at EF1 strength, downing and snapping many trees throughout northern Independence County.

=== Devastation in Cave City ===
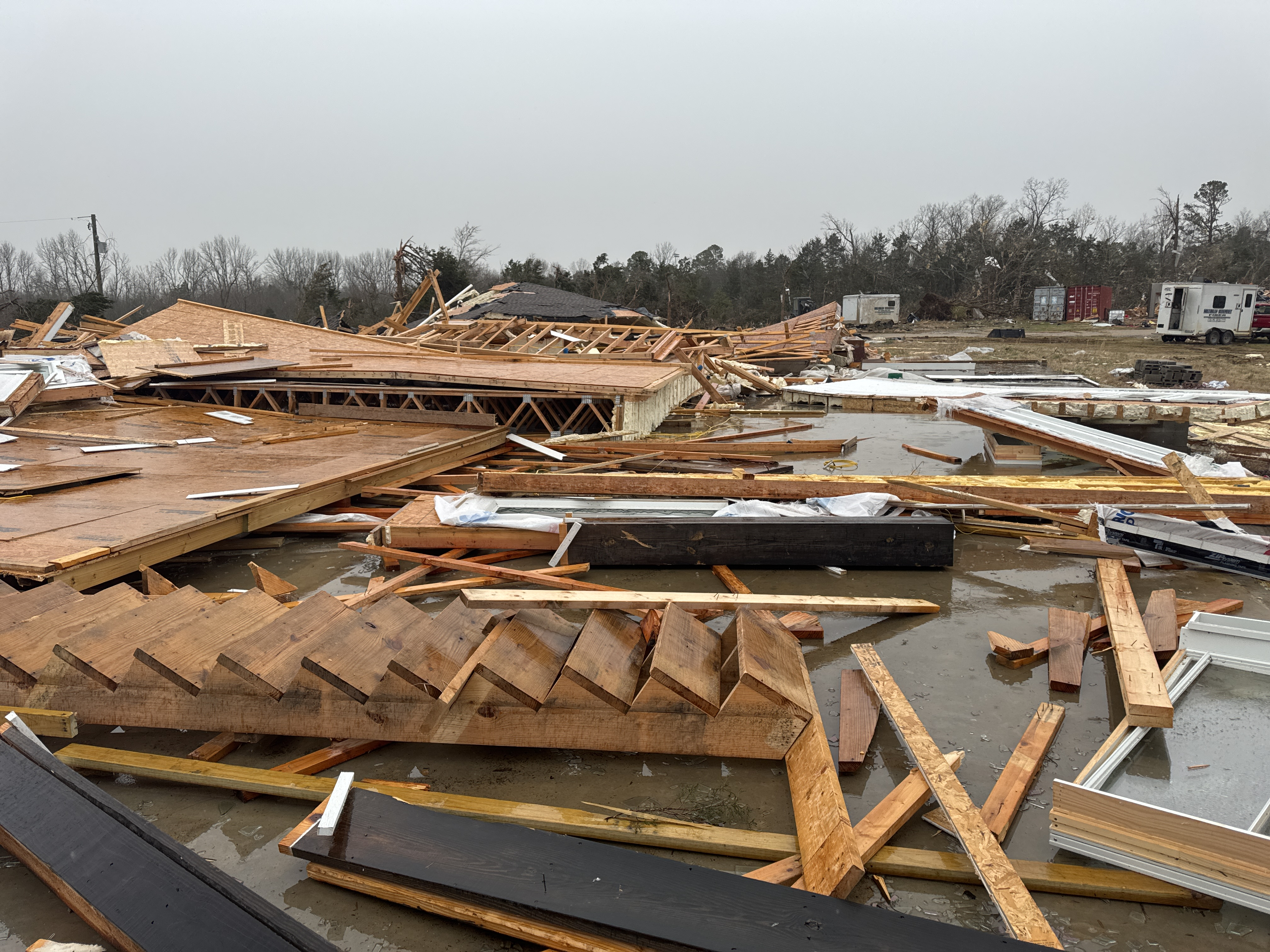
High-end EF3 damage to a nearly finished home in eastern Cave City.

Numerous trees continued to be destroyed by the tornado as it began to approach the Independence–Sharp County border, simultaneously also encroaching towards Cave City from the southwest. A new tornado warning was issued at 10:40 PM CDT (UTC-03:40) for the city and surrounding areas, minutes before entering proper areas. Crossing West South Street, the tornado began to strengthen to EF2 intensity, as a cell tower was crumpled to the ground. The first residence impacted in Cave City, was a mobile home that completely obliterated at EF2 intensity, with no debris left remaining where it once was along West Center. Across over the road, the tornado became intense and caused EF3 damage to a house, tearing down many of the walls while an interior room was left standing. Nearby but poorly built houses were torn apart or shifted off their foundations at EF2 intensity, which also happened to a few trees which were snapped and sprayed with debris. Many structures in the southwestern part of Cave City suffered extensive levels of damage, before the tornado approached the central area. Here, the tornado impacted the Church of Christ. Nearby, EF2 damage occurred to a metal car shop building, which was twisted and destroyed on the west side of US 167. A billboard was also ruined in the vicinity of the destroyed car shop. To the southeast along Misty Street, extensive EF2 damage persisted with a few homes and many trees that saw considerable destruction. Along the street, a truck license plate was found embedded in a broken tree trunk. Across over on Meadow Lane, the tornado obliterated most of a poorly built home at EF2 intensity, before crossing over onto North Street and eventually Curia Creek.

Entering a large property on the eastern side of Cave City, the tornado would reach its maximum strength, impacting a building site where a large house undergoing construction was leveled for most parts at high-end EF3 intensity. Nearby, some large vehicles were tossed some distance by the tornado, before exiting Cave City and weakening down to EF1 strength.

=== Trek through isolated areas ===
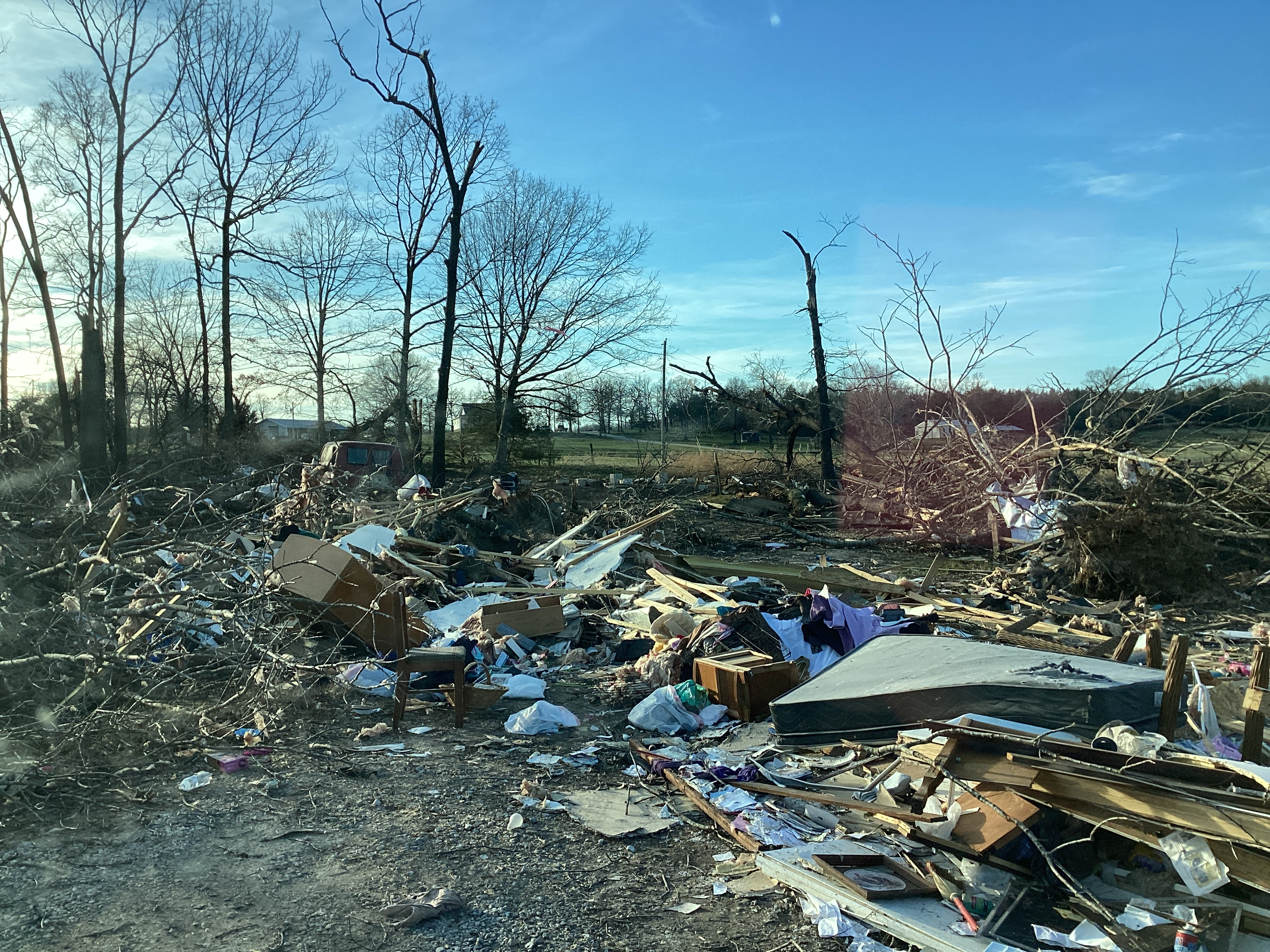
A mobile home destroyed by a tornado at high-end EF2 intensity northeast of Calamine.

After leaving Cave City proper, the tornado remained significant as it continued through southeastern Sharp County. Along West Prosperity Road, the tornado destroyed several structures at EF2 strength, mainly a mobile home and a few outbuildings as well as many trees. Another instance occurred nearby, along South Fairview Road as the tornado badly damaged a large two-story house at high-end EF2 intensity, with lower significant estimates to a tree and an outbuilding that was swept away clean off the foundation. The tornado weakened down to EF1 intensity as it traversed through forested terrain, before approaching Calamine from the southwest.

The tornado would enter the community, tracking along AR 115. One modular home was completely obliterated at high-end EF2 intensity, while up ahead EF2 damage occurred to a metal building system to the east-northeast. After leaving Sharp County for Lawrence County the tornado tracked a long distance through the northwestern sections of the county. South of Smithville, the tornado impacted a farmstead at EF1 intensity, causing minor damage to most structures though one poorly built outbuilding was flattened. Later, the tornado passed northwest of Lake Charles State Park, on approach for Black Rock. Due to the severity of the situation, the National Weather Service already had issued a PDS tornado warning for the area earlier at 11:04 PM CDT (UTC-04:04) as a damaging tornado in progress was reported. The tornado would pass west and north of Black Rock, sparing the small city from a direct hit. A chicken farm to the north suffered EF1 damage as the roofs of a few chicken houses were removed.

=== Entrance into the Delta region ===
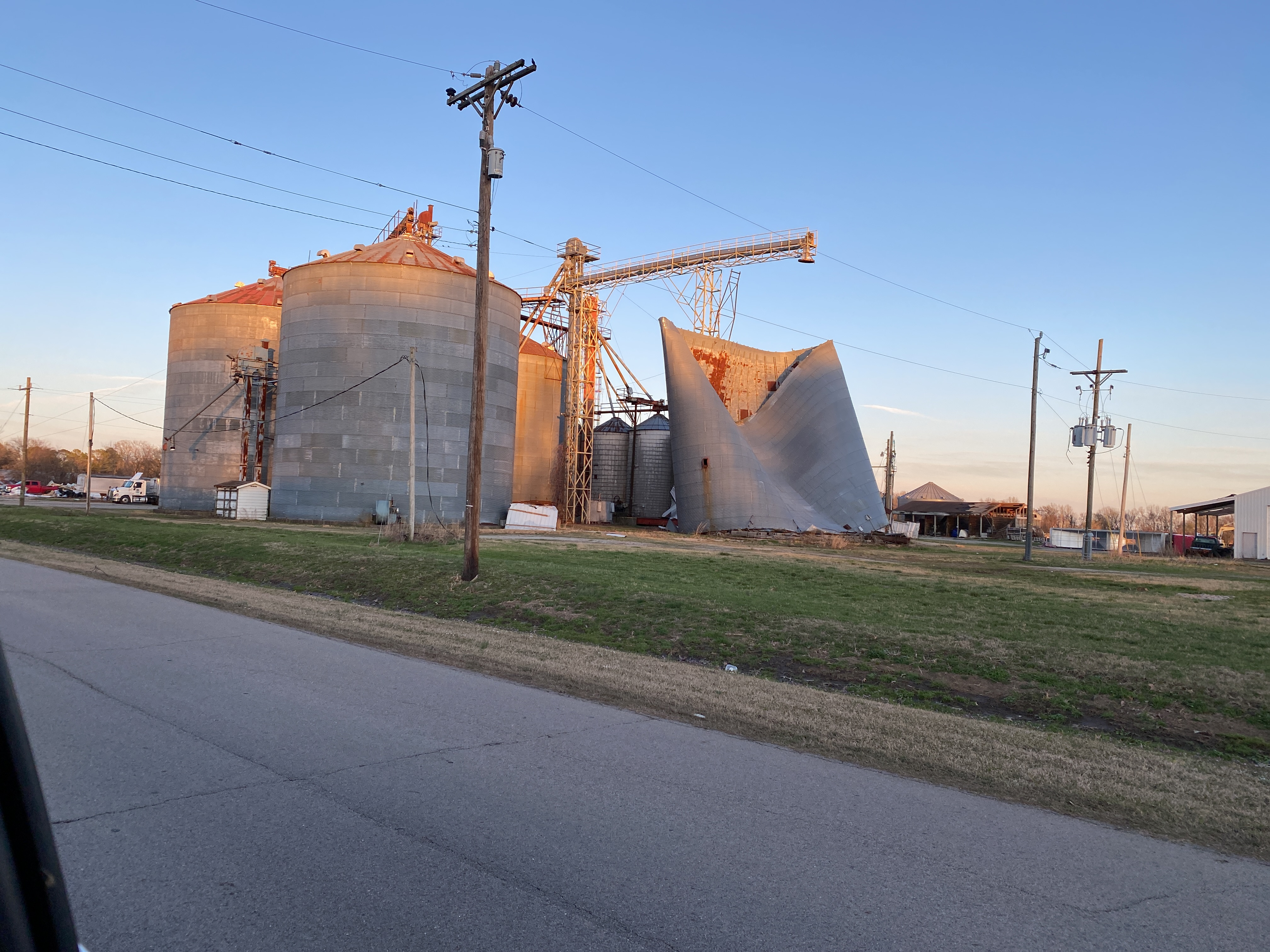
A damaged grain bin in Reyno.

The tornado would then cross both the Spring and Black Rivers into Randolph County, into the open farmland of the Mississippi River Delta and mainly causing EF1 tree damage around this area, and also impacting the Shannon area. Approaching Pocahontas from the south, the National Weather Service issued a new PDS tornado warning which included the city and surrounding areas at 11:26 PM CDT (UTC-04:26). It ultimately missed the eastern side of Pocahontas to the east, following the Current River towards Biggers. Along US 67, which the tornado was paralleling for an enduring amount of time, EF2 damage was noted as trees and powerlines were downed. Six more poles were downed at EF2 intensity as the tornado passed east of Biggers. One house to the northeast sustained EF1 damage before the tornado was approaching Reyno. 40 more poles were downed as the tornado intensified back at EF2 intensity again along US 67. After that, the tornado passed through the southern side of Reyno, causing EF0-EF1 damage before exiting.

The tornado then exited Randolph County for Clay County, entering the county warning area of the National Weather Service in Memphis, Tennessee. A third PDS tornado warning was issued earlier at 11:18 PM CDT (UTC-04:18) as the tornado was still in Randolph County. The storm kept on fluctuating in intensity, again strengthening to EF2 intensity southeast of Datto, where multiple grain bins were damaged, some removed off their foundations. The tornado proceeded and began a steady weakening trend, down to EF1 intensity as it was approaching areas west of Corning. A few structures were hit by the tornado at EF0 intensity, including some impacted by non-tornadic winds before the tornado lifted at 11:51 p.m. CDT (UTC–04:51) to the north of Corning, or just south of the Missouri state border.

== Aftermath ==
=== Statistics ===
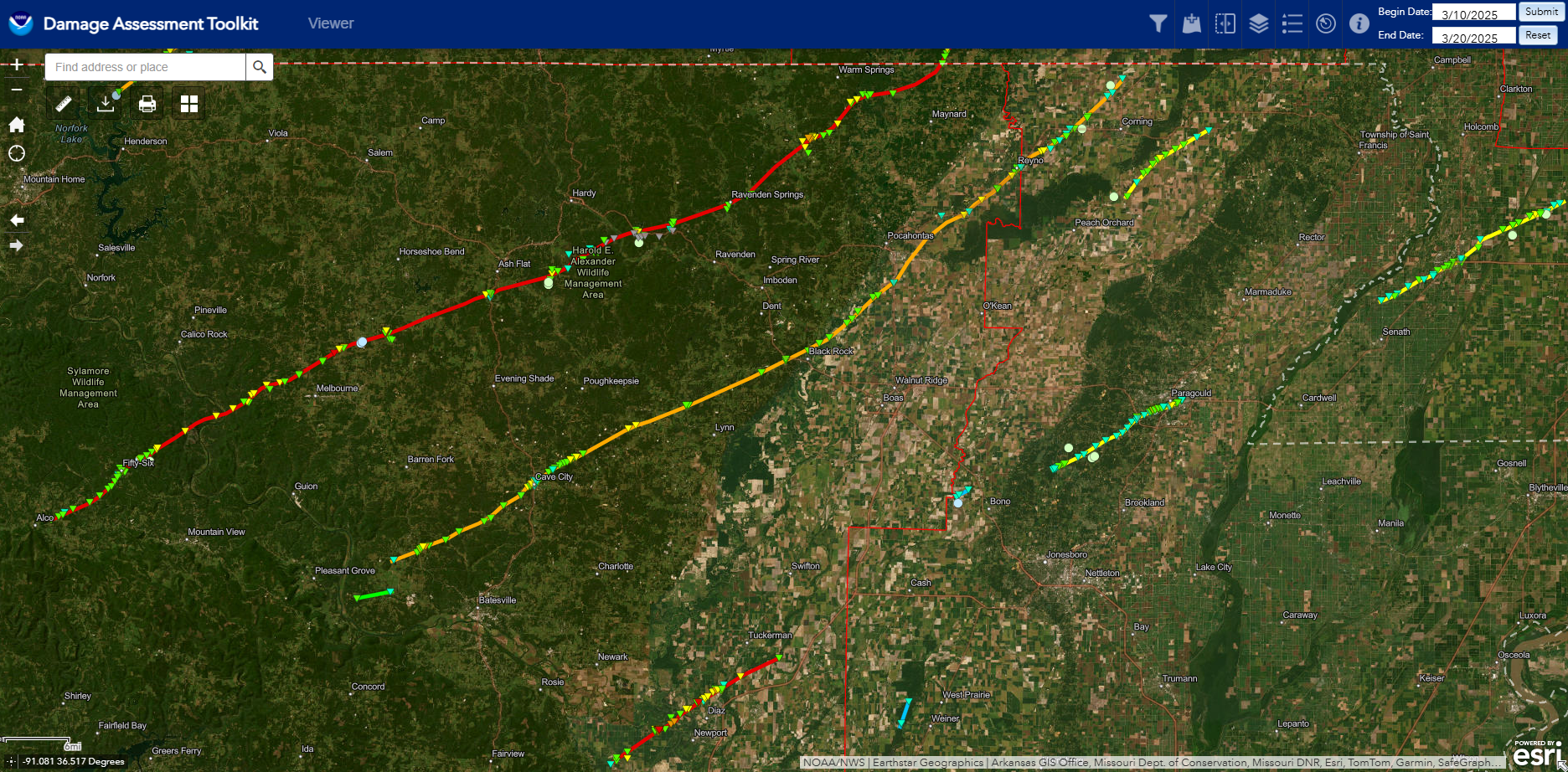
Map of the tornadoes that struck predominantly northern Arkansas on March 14, 2025. The EF3 Cushman–Cave City tornado is the centered long orange track. Parameters Other (Miscellaneous) Thunderstorm wind EFU / Unknown EF0 / 65–85 mph EF1 / 86–110 mph EF2 / 111–135 mph EF3 / 136–165 mph EF4 / 166–200 mph

In all, this long-lived and deadly tornado was rated at high-end EF3 on the Enhanced Fujita scale, with estimated winds at 165 mph (266 km/h) per the National Weather Service weather forecasting office (WFO) in Little Rock, Arkansas. The tornado killed three people, reached a maximum width of 700 yd (0.40 mi; 0.64 km) and traversed along a path 81.84 mi (131.71 km) long during its 1-hour and 35-minute lifespan, making it the second longest tracked tornado of the March 14, 2025 tornado outbreak, behind the Fifty-Six–Larkin EF4 tornado. It caused widespread and severe damage to several communities across Independence, Sharp, Lawrence, Randolph and Clay counties before dissipating just south of the Missouri state line.

=== Damage and casualties ===
==== Cushman region ====
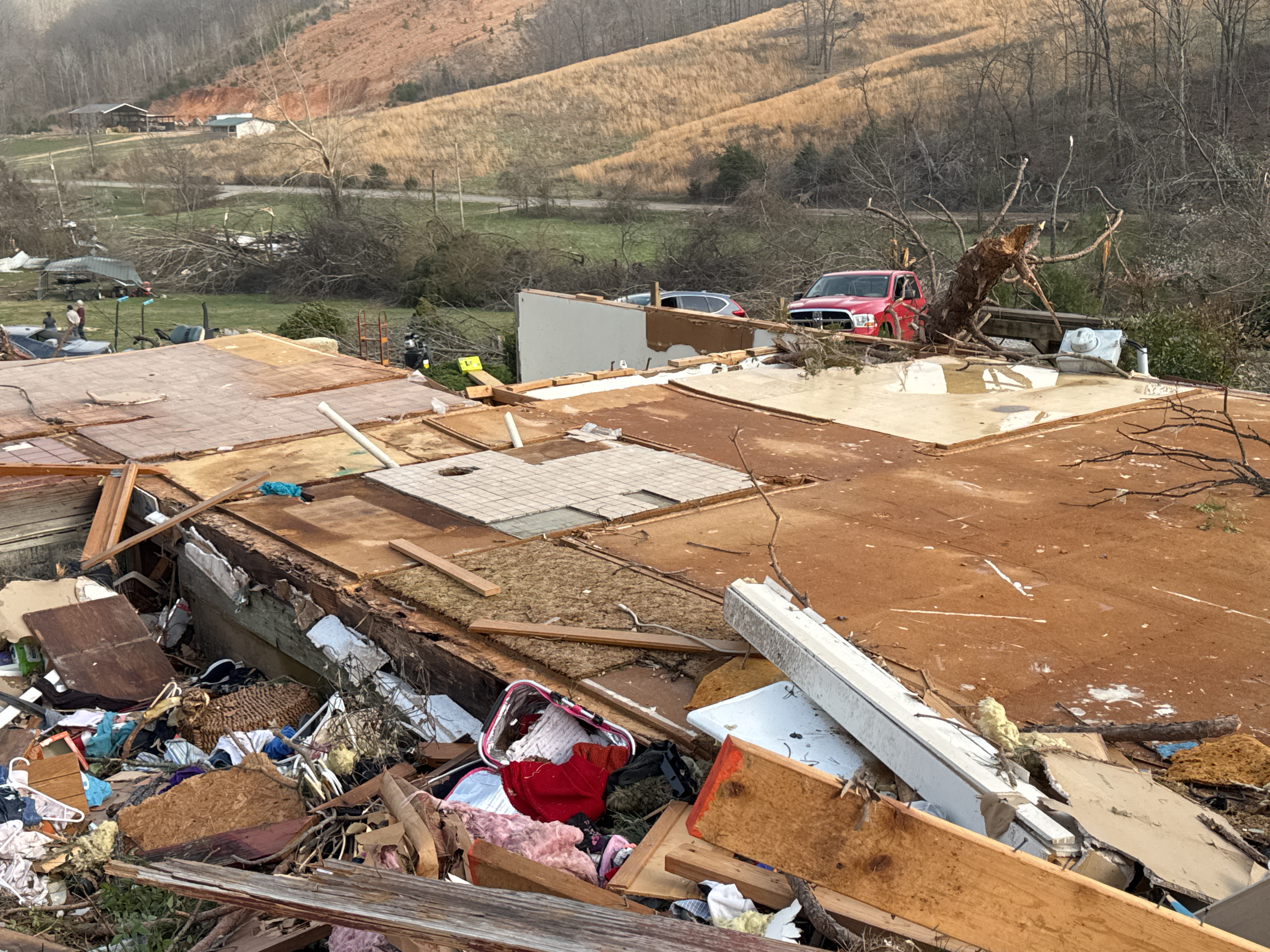
EF2 damage to a destroyed split-level home southeast of Cushman along Claxton Loop. One woman was killed inside this house.

Three people were killed by the tornado along Claxton Loop, alongside 20 minor-reported injuries associated by the tornado southeast of Cushman per the Independence County Sheriff's Office. The three deaths were all women, two of them sisters. One of the three women died inside her home, while the sisters next door were inside a mobile home.

==== Cave City area ====
During the overnight hours into March 15, Cave City mayor Jonas Anderson placed the city under a state of emergency, with a curfew following the tornado. Anderson mentioned that he was able to stay in touch with Arkansas governor Sarah Sanders, who visited the area, and mentioned that Cave City has received help from Arkansas State Police, Arkansas Game & Fish Association and various agencies from other communities nearby. Despite the direct hit by the tornado on Cave City, Anderson reported an unofficial count of five people that were injured and no fatalities in the city.

Approximately 50 homes and 20 businesses in Cave City were destroyed, alongside the city's fire department which was hit. Many businesses, such as the grocery store and health clinic were all badly damaged and were temporarily closed, though some were able to relocate in other parts of the city. The AT&T cell tower in southwestern Cave City also was badly damaged. Thriving Cities Lab, a think tank that focused on community and civic development in Cave City, had difficulties operating for their cause due to the tornado, especially as they were about to start a membership drive when the tornado occurred. However despite all that, the chamber director thinks that 2025 was a rather successful year, with how also the community bonded together so well after the tornado.

==== Rural Sharp to Clay counties ====
After Cave City, the EF3 tornado caused isolated damage to mainly rural residences and outbuildings, with predominantly tree damage across southeastern Sharp County. Near Calamine, one mobile home was destroyed. The same happened in neighboring Lawrence County, with the tornado dealing insignificant damage to forested areas near Lake Charles State Park, near Black Rock despite an issued PDS tornado warning in effect at the time. In Randolph County, the tornado caused damage in the Shannon community, south of Pocahontas. A few houses in a trailer park area were substantially damaged as the tornado passed through. A semi-truck was turned over to its side nearby, alongside many downed powerlines and snapped trees. In Reyno, where the tornado directly went through the small city, no significant (EF2+) damage was reported. After its exit from Reyno into Clay County, the tornado caused approximately $300,000 (2025 USD) in damages throughout the region, mainly to a few farmsteads and farm equipment. Structural damage also occurred west of Corning Municipal Airport, as debris from an outbuilding near US 67 spread north of the airport.

=== Recovery process ===
==== Cave City's efforts ====
Cave City has and still is making remarkable efforts to recover itself after the destructive 2025 EF3 tornado. The day after the tornado on March 15, numerous volunteers aided people who were looking for their lost belongings, whilst also bringing in heavy machinery and equipment to begin cleaning up debris that littered the area. On March 17 of that year, the American Red Cross came into Cave City to provide food, emergency supplies, cleanup kits and many other essential items to the residents who were affected. Throughout mid 2025, Cave City had a difficult period during its recovery, with President Donald Trump under his second term denying federal aid from the Federal Emergency Management Agency, as immediately requested by governor Sarah Sanders towards the impacted city and other communities throughout Arkansas in April that year. This raised lots of frustration and uncertainty on why the Trump administration weren't willing to aid Cave City and impacted areas in Arkansas after the March 14 tornadoes, especially from Cave City mayor Jonas Anderson who was at a ribbon-cutting event for the city's emergency medical service when he heard about this news.

From July 24–26, 2025, Cave City held its 45th watermelon festival since 1980. Unlike other years, the 2025 event had more attendees and marked a moment of resilience in the aftermath of the tornado, what Amy Finster, the festival's director referred to as their "Cave City Comeback." On December 8, Hometown Market, the city's grocery store that was severely damaged by the EF3 tornado, reopened its doors to customers after months of repair and rebuilding.

==== Progress in other areas ====
Across parts of Sharp County, the county was impacted by the two-long tracked tornadoes on March 14, 2025. Community members who had their own properties damaged showed up to help others. First responders had a challenging time with downed powerlines, downed trees, gas leaks and extensive structural damage. Sharp County Sheriff Shane Russell said how back then, when he was doing search in rescue that one of the primary challenges, was identifying the damage path and clearing roads. “I don’t really believe there’s any type of training that can prepare you for the amount of damage,” Russell remarked on the difficulty of the situation back then.

On March 20, approximately 100 senior students from Pocahontas High School helped out to clean debris in the Shannon community, which suffered extensive damage.

== See also ==
- List of North American tornadoes and tornado outbreaks
- Tornadoes of 2025
- List of F3, EF3, and IF3 tornadoes (2020–present)
