= Corning High School (Arkansas) =

Public school in Corning, Arkansas, US

Location
- 602 Bobcat Lane; Corning, Arkansas 72422; United States; 36°25′14″N 90°34′47″W

Information
- School type: Public (government funded)
- Status: Open
- School district: Corning School District
- NCES District ID: 0500009
- Authority: Arkansas Department of Education (ADE)
- CEEB code: 040505
- NCES School ID: 050000900191
- Teaching staff: 46.28 (on FTE basis)
- Grades: 7–12
- Enrollment: 225 (2023–2024)
- Student to teacher ratio: 4.86
- Education system: ADE Smart Core curriculum
- Classes offered: Regular, Advanced Placement
- Campus type: Rural
- Colors: Black and gold
- Athletics: Football, Golf, Basketball, Tennis, Baseball, Softball, Track & Field, Cheer
- Athletics conference: 3A Region 3 (2012–14)
- Mascot: Bobcat
- Team name: Corning Bobcats
- Rival: Piggott High School (Known as the "Rice Bowl")
- Accreditation: ADE; AdvancED (1930–)
- Communities served: Corning, Biggers, Reyno, Maynard, Peach Orchard, Datto, Lafe, Rector, Knobel, Success, Pollard, McDougal
- Feeder schools: Central Ełementary School (grades 3–6)
- Affiliation: Arkansas Activities Association
- Website: www.corningschools.k12.ar.us/o/chs

Corning High School is an accredited comprehensive public high school serving students in grades seven through twelve in the rural community of Corning, Arkansas, United States. It is one of three public high schools located in Clay County and serves the Clay and Randolph County communities of Corning, Biggers, Reyno, Maynard, Peach Orchard, Datto, Lafe, Rector, Knobel, Success, Pollard, and McDougal. With more than 200 students, it is the sole high school in Corning School District.

== Academics ==
The school is accredited by the Arkansas Department of Education (ADE).

The assumed course of study follows the Smart Core curriculum developed by the Arkansas Department of Education (ADE), which requires students to complete at least 24 credit units before graduation. Students engage in regular (core) and career focus courses and exams and may select Advanced Placement (AP) coursework and exams that may lead to college credit.

== Athletics ==
Bobcat Stadium

The Corning High School mascot and athletic emblem is the Bobcat with the school colors of black and gold.

The Corning Bobcats participate in various interscholastic activities in the 3A Classification within the 3A Region 3 Conference as administered by the Arkansas Activities Association. The Bobcats school athletic activities include football, golf (boys/girls), basketball (boys/girls), baseball, softball, cheer, tennis (boys/girls), and track and field (boys/girls).

The "Rice Bowl" is the annual matchup against Clay County rival, Piggott High School. Played since 1926, it is one of the oldest rivalries in Arkansas.

== Notable alumni ==
- W. Stephen Smith (valedictorian – Class of 1968), voice teacher and author, Northwestern University professor of voice and opera.
