= Cane Creek (Butler County, Missouri) =

Stream in the US state of Missouri

Coordinates: 36°31′31″N 90°29′57″W

Cane Creek is a stream in Butler and Carter counties in southeast Missouri.

The headwaters arise in Carter County at and the confluence with Big Cane Creek in Butler County is at . The stream source is in the vicinity of Pinewoods Lake Recreation Area in the Mark Twain National Forest south of U.S. Route 60 southeast of Ellsinore. The stream flows east passing under Route 60 into Butler County and passing north of Brush Arbor. The stream turns southeast passes under Route 60 again and then turns south passing under Missouri Route PP west of Poplar Bluff, receives the Tenmile Creek tributary and exits the national forest.

Fletcher Branch and Wolf Creek join Cane Creek shortly after. From there, the stream flows on south passing under U.S. Route 160/U.S. Route 67 and passes east of Harviell. The stream continues to the south to southwest passing under Missouri Route 142 east of Neelyville to merge into Big Cane Creek and on to its confluence with the Black River in Clay County in north Arkansas.

The creek derived its name from the abundant large cane brakes that occurred along the stream banks.
