= Corning School District =

Public school district based in Corning, Arkansas, United States

Location
- 479 Bobcat Lane; Corning, Arkansas 72941 United States

District information
- Grades: PK–12
- Superintendent: Kellee Smith
- Accreditation: Arkansas Department of Education
- Schools: 3
- NCES District ID: 0500009

Students and staff
- Students: 1,072
- Teachers: 83.05 (on FTE basis)
- Staff: 158.05 (on FTE basis)
- Student–teacher ratio: 12.91
- Athletic conference: 3A Region 3
- District mascot: Bobcat
- Colors: Gold; Black

Other information
- Website: www.corningschools.k12.ar.us

Corning School District is a public school district based in Corning, Arkansas, United States. The school district encompasses 364.77 square miles (944.7 km^{2}) of land, including portions of Clay County and Randolph County. Clay County communities include Corning, Datto, Knobel, McDougal, and Success. Randolph County communities include Reyno and almost all of Biggers. Peach Orchard is not in the Corning district, but is in an exclave of the Greene County Tech School District, and an enclave of the Corning district.

The district provides comprehensive education for more than 1,050 prekindergarten through grade 12 students and is accredited by the Arkansas Department of Education (ADE) and AdvancED.

== History ==
The Knobel School District consolidated with the Corning School District on July 1, 1985.

In May 2004, the former Biggers–Reyno School District consolidated with the Corning School District. The consolidation became effective July 1 of that year.

== Schools ==
- Corning High School, located in Corning and serving more than 450 students in grades 7 through 12
- Central Elementary School, located in Corning and serving more than 300 students in grades 3 through 6
- Park Elementary School, located in Corning and serving more than 275 students in prekindergarten through grade 2
