= Calamine (disambiguation) =

Calamine most commonly refers to calamine lotion.

Calamine also may refer to:

- Calamine, a pinkish powder used in calamine lotion
- Calamine (mineral), a historic name for an ore of zinc
- Calamine brass, an early method of making brass by reacting copper metal with calamine (zinc) ore
- Calamine, Arkansas, an unincorporated community in Sharp County, Arkansas
- Calamine, Wisconsin, an unincorporated community in Lafayette County, Wisconsin
- Calamine, a community and former railway terminus in north east Belgium near the mining community of Moresnet

== See also ==
- Calamintha, a genus of plants
- Kelmis (French: La Calamine), a municipality in Belgium
