= Hurricane Creek (Tenmile Creek tributary) =

Stream in the American state of Missouri

Hurricane Creek is a stream in Butler, Carter and Ripley counties of southern Missouri. A tributary of Tenmile Creek.

The stream headwaters are located at 36°49′08″N 90°38′59″W and the confluence with Tenmile Creek is at 36°47′14″N 90°34′11″W. The community of Milltowm in western Butler County is located on the banks of the stream.

Hurricane Creek was so named on account of a tornado which struck the area in the 1850s.

== See also ==
- List of rivers of Missouri
