= Corning High School =

Corning High School may refer to:

- Corning High School (Arkansas) - located in Corning, Arkansas.
- Corning High School (California) - located in Corning, California.
- Corning High School (Iowa) - located in Corning, Iowa.
