= Milltown, Missouri =

- Unincorporated community
- Location within Missouri Location within the United States
- Coordinates: 36°46′39″N 90°36′18″W
- Country: United States
- State: Missouri
- County: Butler
- Elevation: 440 ft (130 m)
- Time zone: UTC-6 (Central (CST))
  - Summer (DST): UTC-5 (CDT)
- Area code: 573
- GNIS feature ID: 751105

Milltown is an unincorporated community in western Butler County, Missouri, United States. Milltown is located on Hurricane Creek, approximately two miles west of its confluence with Tenmile Creek, as well as Beaverdam Creek, which is two miles northwest. It lies within the Mark Twain National Forest, about ten miles west of Poplar Bluff.

The village was alternately known as Kerens. An early post office existed at the location with the name of Kerens. The post office was named for R.C. Kerens who was a St. Louis postmaster.
