= W. Stephen Smith =

American opera singer

Professor W. Stephen Smith
- Born: December 18, 1950 (age 75); Jonesboro, Arkansas
- Education: Harding University (B.A.); University of Arkansas (M.M.); Oklahoma City University (M.P.A.)
- Occupations: Professor of Voice and Opera at Bienen School of Music of Northwestern University
- Spouse: Carol Mannen Smith
- Children: Emily Smith Jobe, Abby C. Smith
- Parent(s): Buel and Jolene Smith
- Website: wstephensmith.com

William Stephen “Steve” Smith (born December 18, 1950) is an American voice teacher, author and baritone singer. He is a professor of Voice and Opera at the Bienen School of Music of Northwestern University, voice faculty for the Ryan Opera Center of Lyric Opera of Chicago, voice faculty emeritus of the Aspen Music Festival and School and founder/director of the Naked Voice Institute.

== Early life ==
Smith was born in Jonesboro, Arkansas on December 18, 1950, the son of Buel Smith and Jolene (née Hooton). He was raised in Pocahontas, Arkansas and Corning, Arkansas. His father owned a nearby Ford dealership.

As Smith's father did not approve of his musical interests as a child, his first job was mowing a neighbor's lawn every week in order to be able to afford to pay for piano lessons on his own.

== Education and early career ==
After graduating as valedictorian from Corning High School in 1968, Smith attended Harding University, where he graduated with a B.A. in music in 1972. Smith's voice teacher at Harding was Erle T. Moore. He continued at the University of Arkansas, studying voice with Richard Brothers and graduating with an M.M. in voice in 1975.

He was then hired as a one-year sabbatical replacement choir director at Oklahoma Christian University, and remained on the faculty when a professorship was created for him the following year. His teaching responsibilities included voice lessons, music theory, musicianship and stage directing of student operas and musicals. During his first year at OC, he became interested in the pedagogy of Inez Lunsford Silberg, who taught voice at the nearby Oklahoma City University. Smith enrolled in OKCU's M.P.A. program in opera performance, taking classes while continuing to serve on the faculty of OC, and graduating in 1981. He remained on the faculty of OC until 1987, when he was hired as the chair of the voice department of St. Louis Conservatory, a position he held until that institution closed in 1990.

== Career ==
Smith was appointed to the faculty of Moores School of Music of the University of Houston in 1990. In 1991, he began instructing apprentice artists of the Houston Grand Opera Studio. In 1996, he joined the faculty of the Aspen Music Festival and School. In 1998, he was appointed to the faculty of The Juilliard School. He resigned from the University of Houston but retained his position with Houston Grand Opera, commuting weekly between New York and Houston until he resigned from Houston Grand Opera in 2003.

In 2011, Smith joined the faculty of Northwestern University. Subsequent to his appointment, he founded the Naked Voice Institute, a summer program of Northwestern University that instructs students in his method of pedagogy.

Prominent students Smith has instructed include Christine Brewer, Joyce DiDonato, Rod Gilfry, Brian Mulligan and Eric Owens.

== Pedagogy ==
Since the early 19th century, vocal pedagogy has made use of the vocalise as a means to present to the student specific technical challenges with an aim to solving those challenges in order to make a sound of ever increasing quality and consistency.

Smith's pedagogy differs from this tradition in that he has developed a series of six vocalises, which he trains in sequence, that he has designed to first isolate two specific activities that produce vocal sound: phonation, as in conversational speech, and breath release, as in a voiced sigh. In isolation, these activities do not necessarily produce a pleasing or complete sound. Subsequent vocalises in Smith's progression seek to achieve balance between these two forces.

Smith's first vocalise, a slow, sostenuto declamation of the phrase [niːneːnɑːnoːnuː] on a single pitch, isolates intention to speak as the primary force of tone generation.

His second vocalise, an ascending glissando followed by a descent from scale degree five to scale degree one in major, isolates the release of breath (as in Bernoulli's Principle) as the primary force of tone generation.

His third vocalise is a legato ascending and descending arpeggiation of a major triad, utilizing the same phonemes as the first vocalise.

His fourth vocalise trains the balanced onset of phonation through the performance of a sequence of detached tones on [ɑ].

His fifth vocalise trains continuous breath release through slow, followed by rapid, arpeggiation of the interval of a perfect fourth on [ɑː].

His sixth vocalise is a swift ascending major scale encompassing the range of a perfect eleventh, followed by a descending arpeggio outlining a dominant seventh chord before returning to the tonic, on [eː] for the first four tones, [ɑː] on tones five through eight and [oː] for the remainder of the vocalise, to promote flexibility and range extension.

== Awards ==
- Outstanding Alumnus Award – College of Arts and Humanities, Harding University – 1998
- Distinguished Alumni Academy (inaugural inductee in Music) – Fulbright College of Arts and Sciences, University of Arkansas – 1999
- Honorary Doctor of Arts and Humane Letters degree (D.A.H.) – University of Arkansas – 2012
- New Horizons Faculty – Aspen Music Festival and School – 2001, 2009 & 2013

== Personal life ==
Smith is married to the former Carol Christine Mannen, and has two daughters, pastry chef Emily Smith Jobe and singer/actress Abby C. Smith.
