= Knobel, Arkansas =

- City
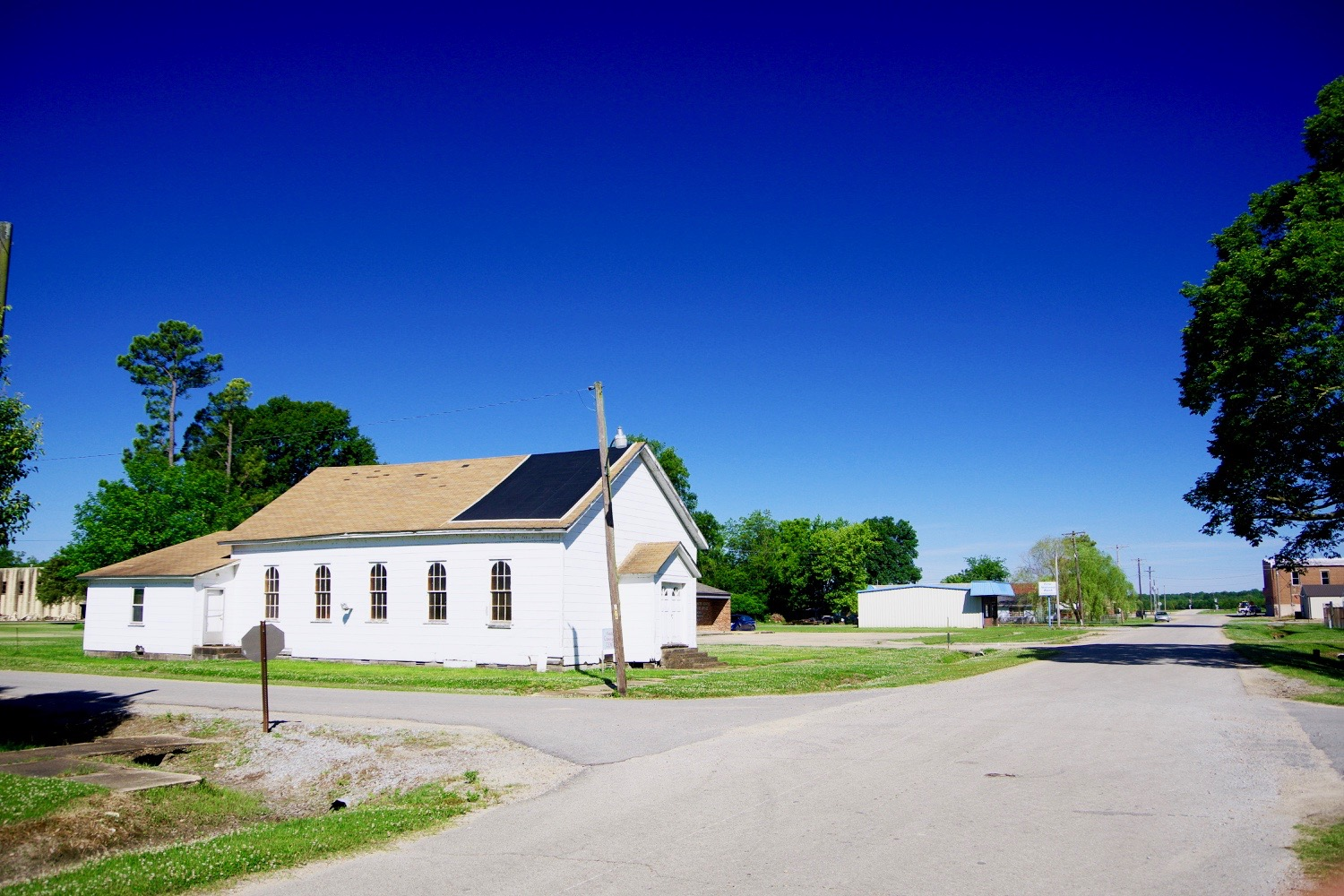
- Maple Street

- Location of Knobel in Clay County, Arkansas.
- Coordinates: 36°19′12″N 90°36′08″W
- Country: United States
- State: Arkansas
- County: Clay
- Established: November 14, 1896

Area
  - Total: 0.42 sq mi (1.09 km^{2})
  - Land: 0.42 sq mi (1.09 km^{2})
  - Water: 0 sq mi (0.00 km^{2})
- Elevation: 279 ft (85 m)

Population (2020)
  - Total: 147
  - Estimate (2025): 143 ▼
  - Density: 349.3/sq mi (134.87/km^{2})
- Time zone: UTC-6 (Central (CST))
  - Summer (DST): UTC-5 (CDT)
- ZIP code: 72435
- Area code: 870
- FIPS code: 05-37240
- GNIS feature ID: 2404841

Knobel (/ˈnoʊbəl/) is a city in Clay County, Arkansas, United States. The population was 147 at the 2020 census.

== History ==
Knobel was established in the 1870s as a stop along the St. Louis, Iron Mountain and Southern Railway. A post office with the name “Knobel” was operating in the town by 1874. In 1884, the railroad constructed a large hotel, Knobel House, and a town was platted shortly afterward. Knobel incorporated in 1896. On January 21, 1999, a violent F4 tornado hit areas around the town.

== Geography ==
Knobel is located at 36°19′10″N 90°36′6″W (36.319360, -90.601780). The city lies southwest of Corning along Arkansas Highway 90.

According to the United States Census Bureau, the town has a total area of 1.1 km^{2} (0.42 sq mi), all land.

== Demographics ==
Historical population
Census	Pop.	Note	%±
1900	410		—
1910	362		−11.7%
1920	390		7.7%
1930	486		24.6%
1940	375		−22.8%
1950	417		11.2%
1960	339		−18.7%
1970	375		10.6%
1980	503		34.1%
1990	317		−37.0%
2000	358		12.9%
2010	287		−19.8%
2020	147		−48.8%
2025 (est.)	143	▼	−2.7%
U.S. Decennial Census

As of the census of 2000, there were 358 people, 144 households, and 101 families residing in the town. The population density was329.1 people /km^{2} (852 people/mi^{2}). There were 156 housing units at an average density of 143.4 units /km^{2} (371 units/mi^{2}). The racial makeup of the town was 97.77% White, 0.56% Black or African American and 1.68% Native American. 2.79% of the population were Hispanic or Latino of any race.

There were 144 households, out of which 34.0% had children under the age of 18 living with them, 56.3% were married couples living together, 8.3% had a female householder with no husband present, and 29.2% were non-families. 26.4% of all households were made up of individuals, and 16.0% had someone living alone who was 65 years of age or older. The average household size was 2.49 and the average family size was 2.95.

In the town, the population was spread out, with 27.9% under the age of 18, 9.5% from 18 to 24, 29.3% from 25 to 44, 18.7% from 45 to 64, and 14.5% who were 65 years of age or older. The median age was 34 years. For every 100 females, there were 103.4 males. For every 100 females age 18 and over, there were 101.6 males.

The median income for a household in the town was $18,750, and the median income for a family was $32,000. Males had a median income of $21,705 versus $15,000 for females. The per capita income for the town was $10,624. About 20.0% of families and 25.2% of the population were below the poverty line, including 13.6% of those under age 18 and 36.2% of those age 65 or over.

== Education ==
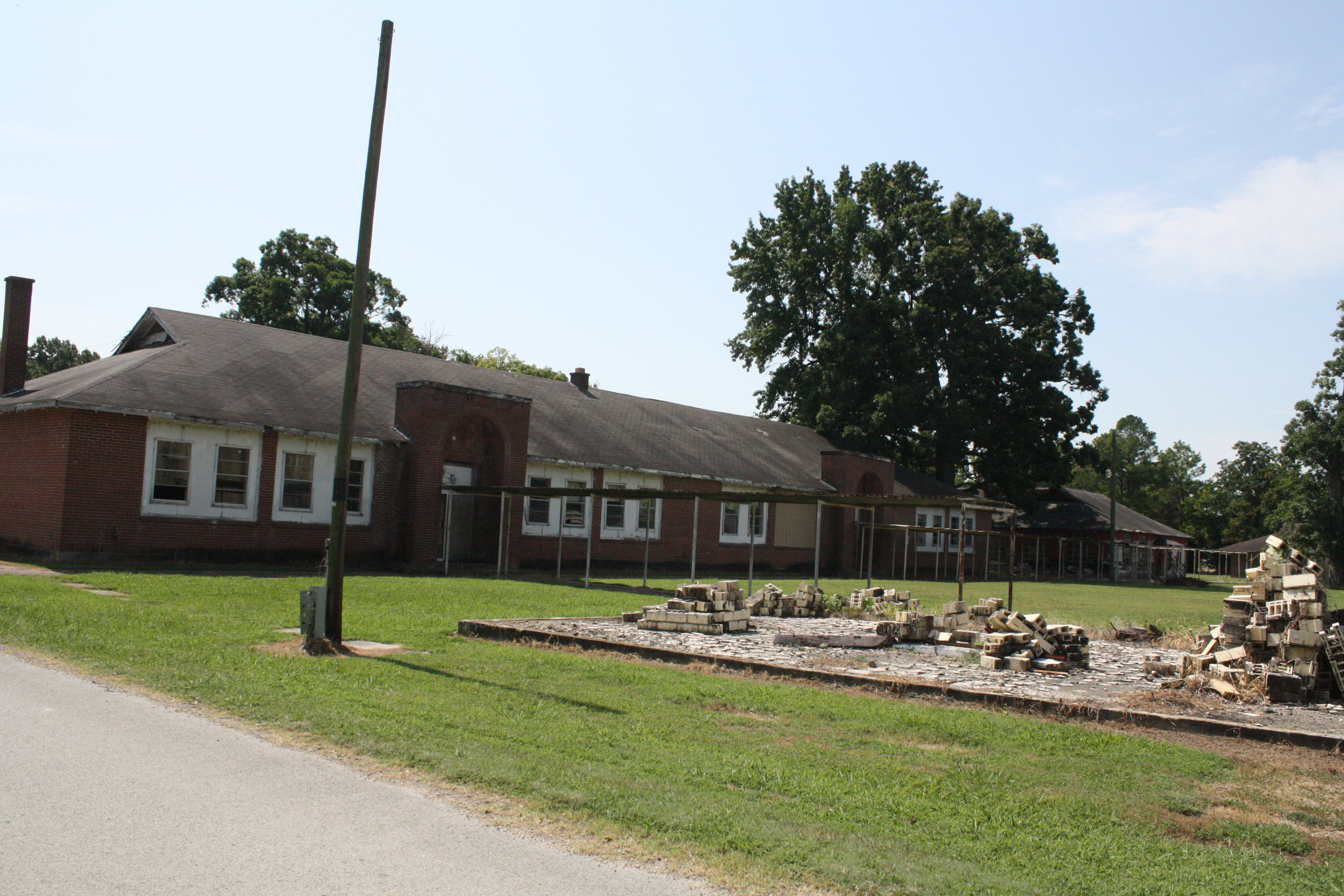
Former school building in Knobel

The Corning School District operates public schools. The Knobel School District consolidated into the Corning School District on July 1, 1985.
