= Biggers-Reyno School District =

Defunct school district in Arkansas, United States

District information
- Closed: July 1, 2004 (consolidated into Corning School District)

Biggers-Reyno School District was a school district in Randolph County, Arkansas, serving Biggers and Reyno. It was headquartered in Biggers, and operated two schools: Biggers-Reyno High School in Biggers, and Biggers-Reyno Elementary School in Reyno.

== History ==
Prior to August 26, 1957, the Biggers school district sent, via contract, high school-aged African-American children to Booker T. Washington High School in Jonesboro, Arkansas, which was operated by the Jonesboro School District. On that day the Jonesboro district's board of trustees ended the contract.

By 2004 new laws were passed requiring school districts with enrollments below 350 to consolidate with other school districts. Biggers-Reyno was one of several districts that were unable to find another district willing to consolidate with it, so the Arkansas Board of Education was to forcibly consolidate it. In May 2004, the former Biggers–Reyno School District was consolidated with the Corning School District. The consolidation was effective July 1 of that year.
