= Beaverdam Creek (Little Black River tributary) =

Stream in Missouri, U.S.

Coordinates: 36°41′32″N 90°34′14″W

Beaverdam Creek is a stream in Butler and Ripley counties in the Ozarks of southern Missouri. It is a tributary of the Little Black River.

The stream headwaters arise in northeastern Ripley County at the confluence of North Prong and West Prong creeks at and an elevation of about 435 feet. The stream flows to the south and east entering Butler County about one mile southeast of the headwaters and about two miles southwest of the community of Milltown. The stream meanders to the southeast for about five miles to its confluence with the Little Black River at and an elevation of 315 feet. The confluence is about two miles north of the US Route 160 crossing of the Little Black and about three miles northeast of the community of Fairdealing. Poplar Bluff lies about nine miles east-northeast of the confluence.

Beaverdam Creek was so named on account of beaver dams on its course.

== See also ==
- List of rivers of Missouri
