= Oliver House (Corning, Arkansas) =

Historic house in Arkansas, United States

- U.S. National Register of Historic Places
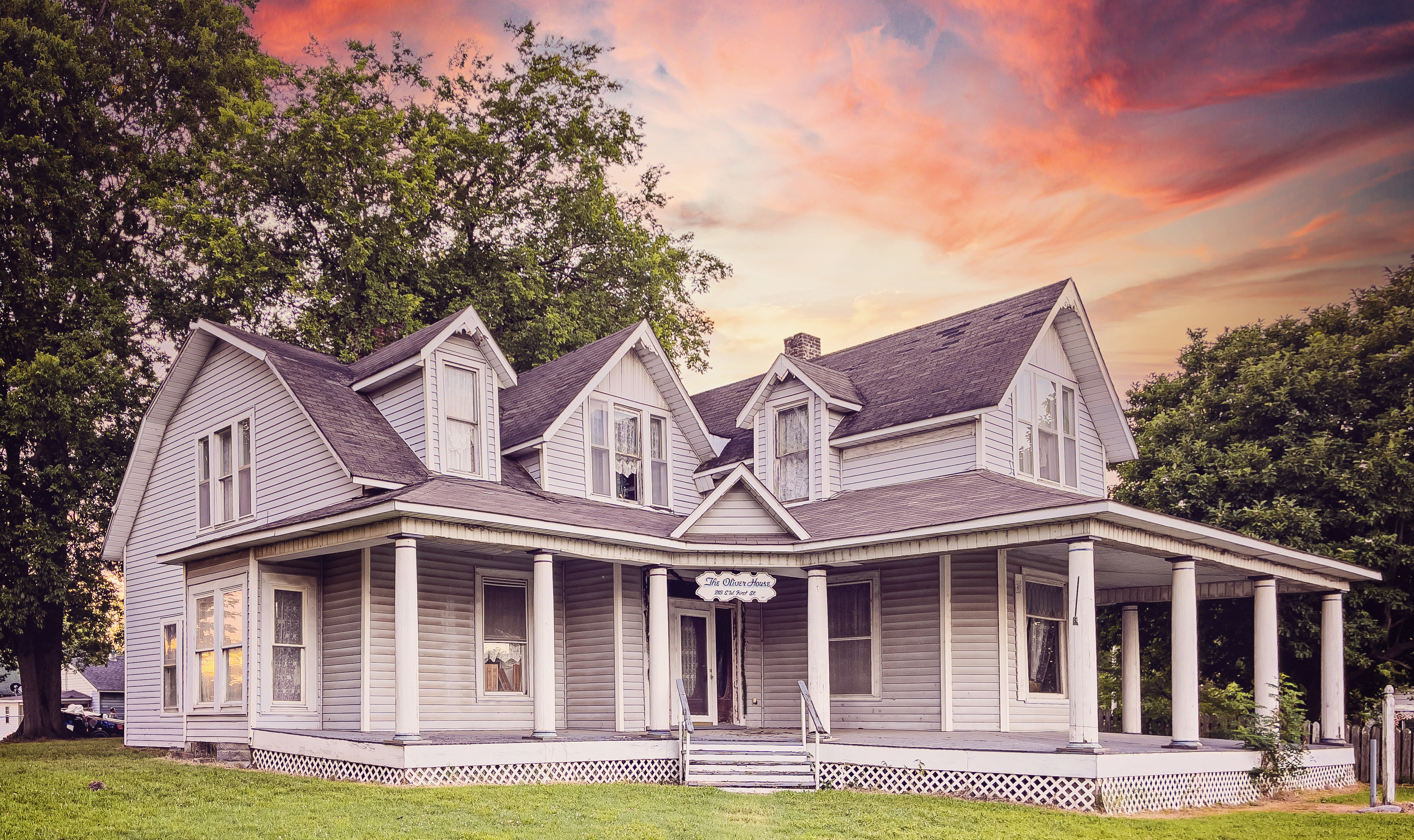

- Location within Arkansas Location within the United States
- Location: 203 W. Front St., Corning, Arkansas
- Coordinates: 36°24′35″N 90°34′44″W
- Built: 1880
- Architectural style: Late Victorian
- NRHP reference No.: 78000578
- Added to NRHP: December 8, 1978

The Oliver House is a historic house at 203 West Front Street in Corning, Arkansas. It is a 2 1/2-story wood-frame L-shaped structure, with a gambrel-roofed main block and a gable-roofed section projecting forward from the right side. A single-story hip-roofed porch extends through the crook of the L and around to the sides, supported by Tuscan columns. The interior retains original woodwork, including two particularly distinguished fireplace mantels. Built c. 1880 and last significantly altered in 1909, it is one of Corning's oldest buildings. It was built by J. W. Harb, and purchased not long afterward by Dr. J. L. Oliver Jr., whose son operated a general store nearby.

The house was listed on the National Register of Historic Places in 1978.

== See also ==
- National Register of Historic Places listings in Clay County, Arkansas
