= Beehole Branch =

Stream in the US state of Missouri

Coordinates: 36°50′37″N 90°38′48″W

Beehole Branch is a stream in southwestern Butler County in the U.S. state of Missouri. It is a tributary of Tenmile Creek.

Beehole Branch was so named on account of the honeybees which frequented a watering hole along the creek's course.

== See also ==
- List of rivers of Missouri
