= Fletcher Branch =

Stream in Butler County, Missouri, U.S.

Coordinates: 36.764777°N 90.515115°W

Fletcher Branch is a stream in Butler County in the U.S. state of Missouri.

Fletcher Branch has the name of an early citizen.

== See also ==
- List of rivers of Missouri
