= Wolf Creek (Cane Creek tributary) =

Stream in the US state of Missouri

Coordinates: 36.748388°N 90.511226°W

Wolf Creek is a stream in Butler County in the U.S. state of Missouri. It is a tributary of Cane Creek.

Wolf Creek was named for the wolves in the area.

== See also ==
- List of rivers of Missouri
