= McDougal, Arkansas =

- City
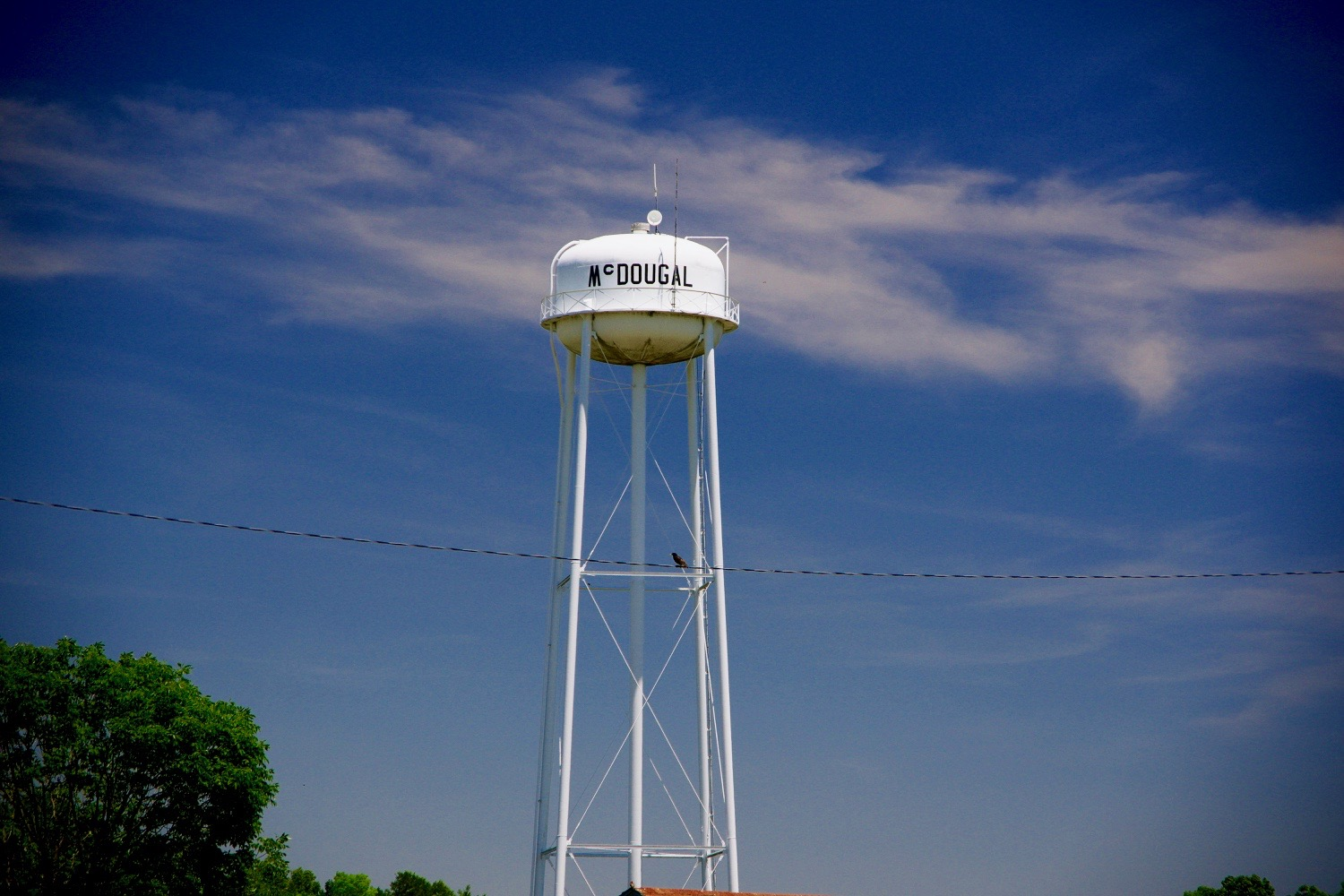
- Water tower

- Location of McDougal in Clay County, Arkansas.
- Coordinates: 36°26′11″N 90°23′27″W
- Country: United States
- State: Arkansas
- County: Clay
- Established: December 14, 1954

Area
  - Total: 0.37 sq mi (0.96 km^{2})
  - Land: 0.37 sq mi (0.96 km^{2})
  - Water: 0 sq mi (0.00 km^{2})
- Elevation: 302 ft (92 m)

Population (2020)
  - Total: 134
  - Estimate (2025): 127 ▼
  - Density: 360.8/sq mi (139.32/km^{2})
- Time zone: UTC-6 (Central (CST))
  - Summer (DST): UTC-5 (CDT)
- ZIP code: 72441
- Area code: 870
- FIPS code: 05-42560
- GNIS feature ID: 2406129

McDougal is a city in Clay County, Arkansas, United States. The population was 134 at the 2020 census.

== History ==
McDougal was established in 1914 as a stop along a branch line of the Butler County Railroad connecting nearby Piggott with Poplar Bluff, Missouri, and serving the flourishing timber industry in the area. The city was probably named for a railroad worker. A depot and general store were constructed in 1914, and a post office opened in 1916. McDougal incorporated in 1954.

== Geography ==
McDougal lies along U.S. Route 62 west of Piggott and east of Corning, and a few miles south of the Arkansas-Missouri state line.

According to the United States Census Bureau, the town has a total area of 1.0 km^{2} (0.4 mi^{2}), all land.

== Demographics ==
Historical population
Census	Pop.	Note	%±
1960	200		—
1970	328		64.0%
1980	239		−27.1%
1990	208		−13.0%
2000	195		−6.2%
2010	186		−4.6%
2020	134		−28.0%
2025 (est.)	127	▼	−5.2%
U.S. Decennial Census

As of the census of 2010, there were 186 people, 87 households, and 62 families residing in the town.The population density was 203.5/km^{2} (526.0/mi^{2}). There were 114 housing units at an average density of 119.0/km^{2} (307.5/mi^{2}). The racial makeup of the town was 98.97% White, and 1.03% from two or more races.

There were 87 households, out of which 21.8% had children under the age of 18 living with them, 63.2% were married couples living together, 6.9% had a female householder with no husband present, and 27.6% were non-families. 24.1% of all households were made up of individuals, and 13.8% had someone living alone who was 65 years of age or older. The average household size was 2.24 and the average family size was 2.63.

In the town, the population was spread out, with 18.5% under the age of 18, 8.2% from 18 to 24, 25.6% from 25 to 44, 29.7% from 45 to 64, and 17.9% who were 65 years of age or older. The median age was 44 years. For every 100 females, there were 97.0 males. For every 100 females age 18 and over, there were 91.6 males.

The median income for a household in the town was $20,250, and the median income for a family was $23,393. Males had a median income of $24,688 versus $18,000 for females. The per capita income for the town was $10,464. About 16.9% of families and 21.3% of the population were below the poverty line, including 13.3% of those under the age of 18 and 23.3% of those 65 or over.
