= Reyno, Arkansas =

- City
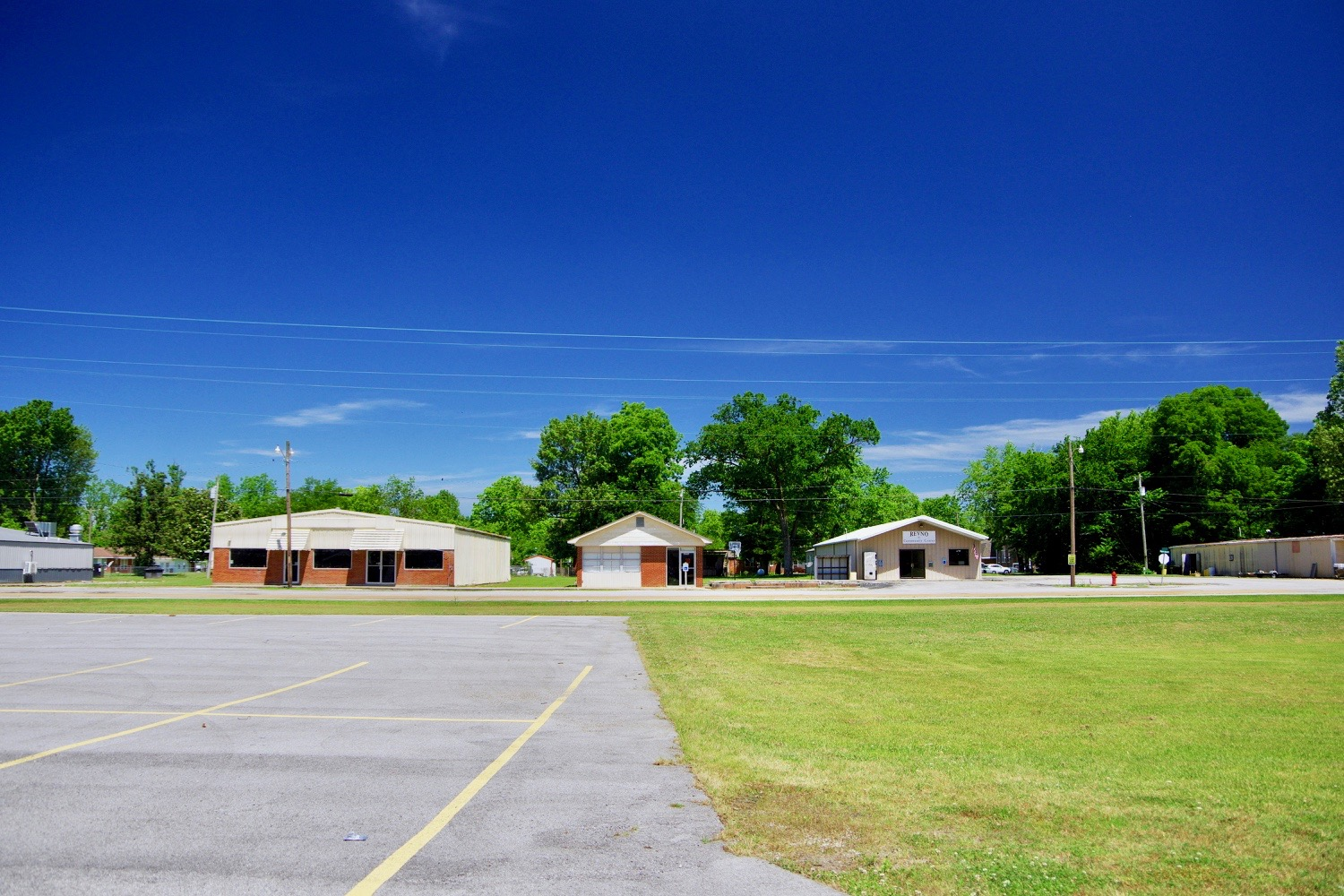
- Reyno

- Location of Reyno in Randolph County, Arkansas.
- Coordinates: 36°21′44″N 90°45′17″W
- Country: United States
- State: Arkansas
- County: Randolph

Area
  - Total: 1.01 sq mi (2.62 km^{2})
  - Land: 1.01 sq mi (2.62 km^{2})
  - Water: 0 sq mi (0.00 km^{2})
- Elevation: 282 ft (86 m)

Population (2020)
  - Total: 391
  - Estimate (2025): 391
  - Density: 387.0/sq mi (149.42/km^{2})
- Time zone: UTC-6 (Central (CST))
  - Summer (DST): UTC-5 (CDT)
- ZIP code: 72462
- Area code: 870
- FIPS code: 05-59180
- GNIS feature ID: 2404608

Reyno is a city in Randolph County, Arkansas, United States. As of the 2020 census, Reyno had a population of 391.

== History ==
The town was originally called Needmore, and was located one and one-half miles south of its present location. This name was changed to Cherokee Bay when the post office operating by that name moved there from its location at Shoemaker's Ferry on Current River. The name was changed again, this time to Reyno, a shortened version of Reynolds, named for Dennis Wells Reynolds, a merchant who opened the town's first store and built the first home there in 1857. In 1901, the town relocated to its present site to be adjacent to the newly built St. Louis-San Francisco Railway there. Upon relocation, the new town adopted the name of Esselwood, but reverted to Reyno due to the majority of residents moving from the previous location.

== Geography ==
Reyno is located at 36°21′44″N 90°45′17″W (36.362304, -90.754772).

According to the United States Census Bureau, the town has a total area of 2.6 km^{2} (1.0 mi^{2}), all land.

=== List of highways ===
- US 62
- US 67
- Highway 328

U.S. Highway 62 and 67 run concurrently, just to the southeast of town.

== Demographics ==
Historical population
| Census | Pop. | Note | %± |
|---|---|---|---|
| 1900 | 138 | | — |
| 1910 | 290 | | 110.1% |
| 1920 | 392 | | 35.2% |
| 1930 | 314 | | −19.9% |
| 1940 | 346 | | 10.2% |
| 1950 | 292 | | −15.6% |
| 1960 | 348 | | 19.2% |
| 1970 | 356 | | 2.3% |
| 1980 | 521 | | 46.3% |
| 1990 | 467 | | −10.4% |
| 2000 | 484 | | 3.6% |
| 2010 | 456 | | −5.8% |
| 2020 | 391 | | −14.3% |
| 2025 (est.) | 391 | | 0.0% |
U.S. Decennial Census

As of the census of 2000, there were 484 people, 193 households, and 143 families residing in the town. The population density was 183.2/km^{2} (474.7/mi^{2}). There were 224 housing units at an average density of 84.8/km^{2} (219.7/mi^{2}). The racial makeup of the town was 94.83% White, 3.51% Black or African American, 1.24% Native American, and 0.41% from two or more races. 0.62% of the population were Hispanic or Latino of any race.

There were 193 households, out of which 39.9% had children under the age of 18 living with them, 51.8% were married couples living together, 18.7% had a female householder with no husband present, and 25.9% were non-families. 23.8% of all households were made up of individuals, and 10.4% had someone living alone who was 65 years of age or older. The average household size was 2.51 and the average family size was 2.94.

In the town the population was spread out, with 31.4% under the age of 18, 6.6% from 18 to 24, 27.9% from 25 to 44, 20.9% from 45 to 64, and 13.2% who were 65 years of age or older. The median age was 34 years. For every 100 females, there were 103.4 males. For every 100 females age 18 and over, there were 88.6 males.

The median income for a household in the town was $21,250, and the median income for a family was $27,500. Males had a median income of $23,542 versus $17,115 for females. The per capita income for the town was $11,373. About 30.1% of families and 36.9% of the population were below the poverty line, including 50.0% of those under age 18 and 25.7% of those age 65 or over.

== Education ==
Corning School District serves Reyno. The consolidation of Biggers-Reyno School District into the Corning District was effective July 1, 2004. Prior to that point, the community was served by Biggers-Reyno High School in Biggers, and Biggers-Reyno Elementary School in Reyno.
