= Calamine, Arkansas =

Calamine
- Unincorporated community
- Calamine's position in Arkansas. Calamine (the United States)
- Coordinates: 36°00′41″N 91°23′56″W
- Country: United States
- State: Arkansas
- County: Sharp
- Elevation: 318 ft (97 m)
- Time zone: UTC-6 (Central (CST))
  - Summer (DST): UTC-5 (CDT)
- GNIS feature ID: 47275

Calamine is an unincorporated community in Sharp County, Arkansas, United States.

== History ==
Zinc mining gave the town its start, hence the name calamine.
