= Biggers, Arkansas =

- Town
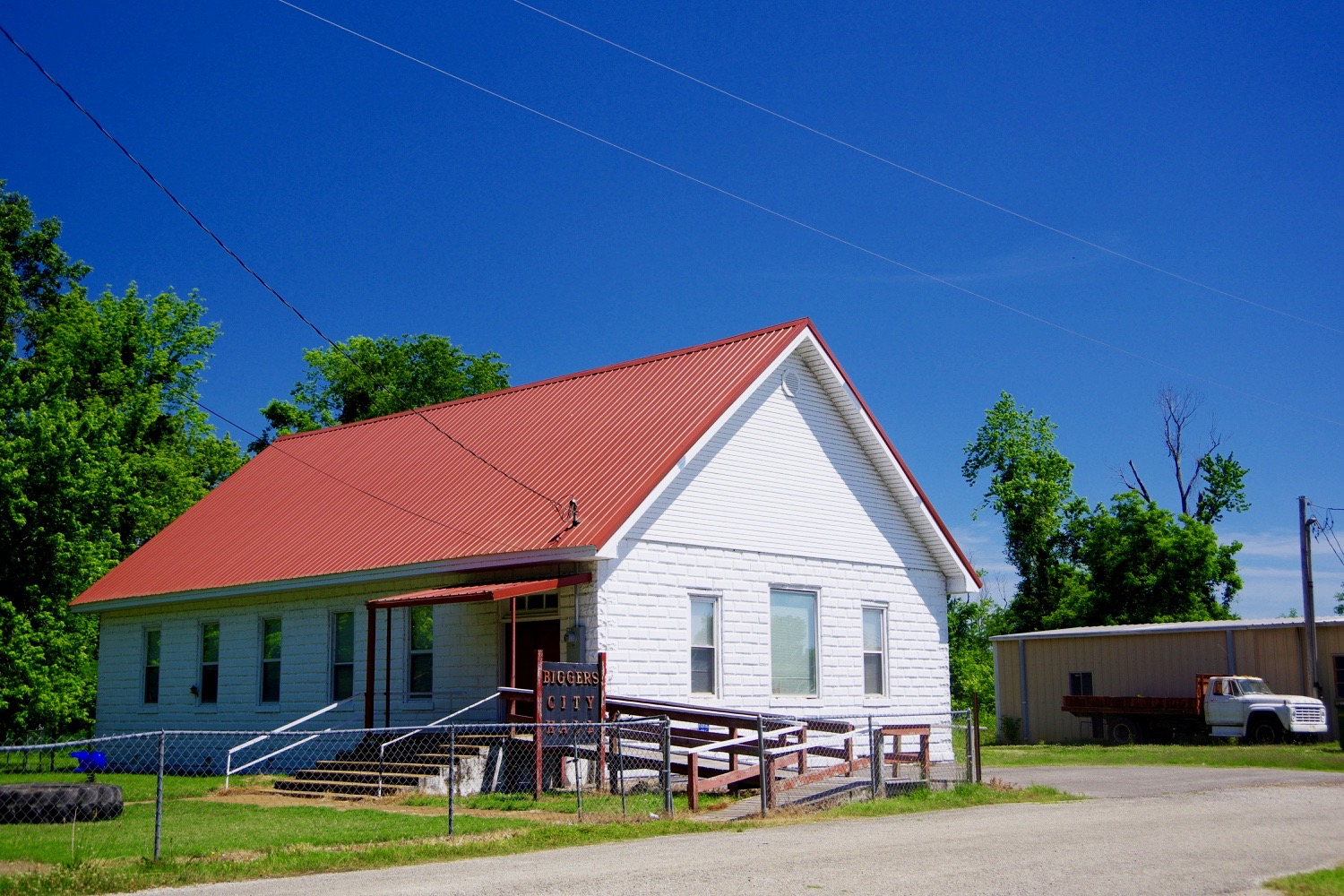
- City Hall

- Location of Biggers in Randolph County, Arkansas.
- Coordinates: 36°19′55″N 90°48′19″W
- Country: United States
- State: Arkansas
- County: Randolph

Area
  - Total: 1.02 sq mi (2.64 km^{2})
  - Land: 1.00 sq mi (2.60 km^{2})
  - Water: 0.019 sq mi (0.05 km^{2})
- Elevation: 285 ft (87 m)

Population (2020)
  - Total: 305
  - Estimate (2025): 313 ▲
  - Density: 304.2/sq mi (117.47/km^{2})
- Time zone: UTC-6 (Central (CST))
  - Summer (DST): UTC-5 (CDT)
- ZIP code: 72413
- Area code: 870
- FIPS code: 05-06040
- GNIS feature ID: 2405264

Biggers is a town in Randolph County, Arkansas, United States. The population was 305 at the 2020 census.

== History ==
During the first half of the 19th century, what is now Biggers was part of a large plantation owned by Arkansas governor Thomas Stevenson Drew. In 1889, a businessman named Benjamin Franklin Bigger, the town’s namesake, bought the land at the town site and established a ferry and distillery. In 1901, a depot was established with the completion of the Southern Missouri and Arkansas Railroad (later part of the St. Louis–San Francisco Railway).

== Geography ==
The Current River passes through the northern part of town.

According to the United States Census Bureau, the town has a total area of 1.0 square mile (2.6 km^{2}), of which 1.0 square mile (2.6 km^{2}) is land and 0.04 square miles (0.10 km^{2}) (1.92%) is water.

=== List of highways ===
- US 62
- US 67

US Highways 62 and 67 run concurrently, just to the southeast of town; no actual state or federal maintained highway runs through the town, however, the original U.S. Highway 67 did run through the town as the current day, "Biggers-Reyno Road" before the town was bypassed and the original route was decommissioned.

== Demographics ==
Historical population
Census	Pop.	Note	%±
1910	435		—
1920	447		2.8%
1930	466		4.3%
1940	456		−2.1%
1950	333		−27.0%
1960	274		−17.7%
1970	372		35.8%
1980	363		−2.4%
1990	337		−7.2%
2000	355		5.3%
2010	347		−2.3%
2020	305		−12.1%
2025 (est.)	313	▲	2.6%
U.S. Decennial Census; 2014 Estimate

As of the census of 2000, there were 355 people, 139 households, and 99 families residing in the town. The population density was 347.9 inhabitants per square mile (134.3/km^{2}). There were 149 housing units at an average density of 146.0 per square mile (56.4/km^{2}). The racial makeup of the town was 95.49% White, 1.97% Black or African American, 1.41% Native American, 0.28% from other races, and 0.85% from two or more races. 0.28% of the population were Hispanic or Latino of any race.

There were 139 households, out of which 28.1% had children under the age of 18 living with them, 61.9% were married couples living together, 6.5% had a female householder with no husband present, and 28.1% were non-families. 23.7% of all households were made up of individuals, and 16.5% had someone living alone who was 65 years of age or older. The average household size was 2.55 and the average family size was 2.98.

In the town, the population was spread out, with 24.2% under the age of 18, 7.3% from 18 to 24, 26.2% from 25 to 44, 20.8% from 45 to 64, and 21.4% who were 65 years of age or older. The median age was 37 years. For every 100 females, there were 95.1 males. For every 100 females age 18 and over, there were 90.8 males.

The median income for a household in the town was $26,250, and the median income for a family was $31,250. Males had a median income of $19,821 versus $17,917 for females. The per capita income for the town was $10,926. About 13.5% of families and 17.3% of the population were below the poverty line, including 18.9% of those under age 18 and 22.5% of those age 65 or over.

== Education ==
Corning School District serves Biggers. The consolidation of Biggers-Reyno School District into the Corning District was effective July 1, 2004. Prior to that point, the community was served by Biggers-Reyno High School in Biggers, and Biggers-Reyno Elementary School in Reyno.

A small slice of the city north of the Current River lies within the Maynard School District.
