= Datto, Arkansas =

- Town
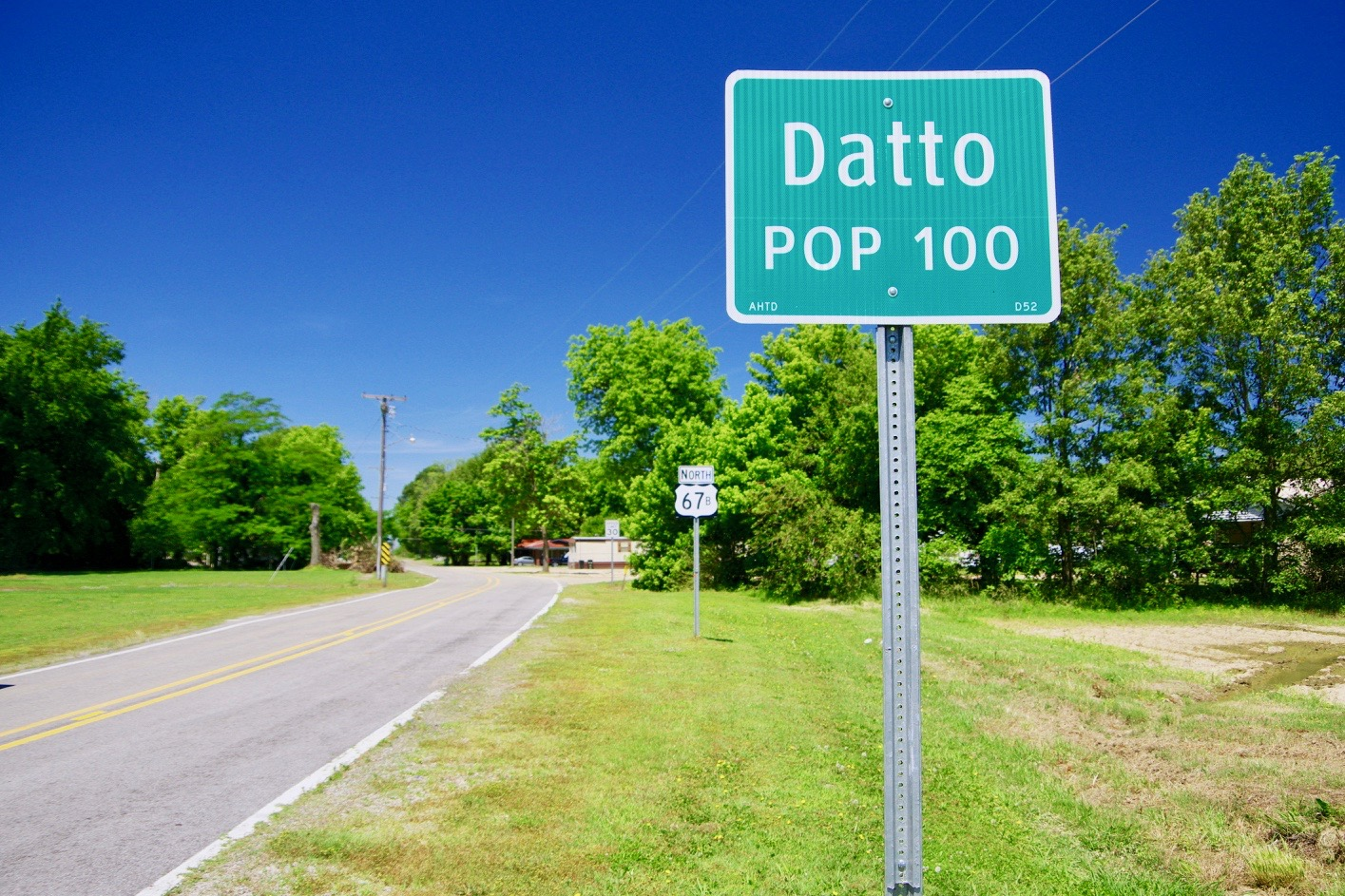
- Entrance along U.S. Route 67

- Location of Datto in Clay County, Arkansas.
- Coordinates: 36°23′33″N 90°43′43″W
- Country: United States
- State: Arkansas
- County: Clay
- Established: June 22, 1905

Area
  - Total: 0.62 sq mi (1.61 km^{2})
- Elevation: 289 ft (88 m)

Population (2020)
  - Total: 65
  - Estimate (2025): 62 ▼
  - Density: 104.7/sq mi (40.42/km^{2})
- Time zone: UTC-6 (Central (CST))
  - Summer (DST): UTC-5 (CDT)
- ZIP code: 72424
- Area code: 870
- FIPS code: 05-17410
- GNIS feature ID: 2406356

Datto is a town in Clay County, Arkansas, United States. The population was 65 at the 2020 census.

== History ==
Datto was established as a railroad stop along the Cotton Belt Railroad in 1900. Members of the Day family, namely Isaac and his sons, Charles and Delmer, provided land for the new city. The city requested the name "Dayton," but after this was rejected by the U.S. Postal Service, the name "Datto" was chosen. Datto was incorporated in 1905.

== Geography ==
Datto is located in western Clay County about 2 miles (3 km) east of the Current River. U.S. Routes 62 and 67 pass through the town concurrently, leading east 8 miles (13 km) to Corning and southwest 17 miles (27 km) to Pocahontas.

According to the United States Census Bureau, the town has a total area of 1.7 square miles (4.4 km^{2}), all land.

== Demographics ==
Historical population
| Census | Pop. | Note | %± |
|---|---|---|---|
| 1910 | 244 | | — |
| 1920 | 242 | | −0.8% |
| 1930 | 275 | | 13.6% |
| 1940 | 198 | | −28.0% |
| 1950 | 176 | | −11.1% |
| 1960 | 167 | | −5.1% |
| 1970 | 142 | | −15.0% |
| 1980 | 112 | | −21.1% |
| 1990 | 120 | | 7.1% |
| 2000 | 97 | | −19.2% |
| 2010 | 100 | | 3.1% |
| 2020 | 65 | | −35.0% |
| 2025 (est.) | 62 | ▼ | −4.6% |
U.S. Decennial Census; 2014 Estimate

As of the census of 2000, there were 97 people, 44 households, and 31 families residing in the town. The population density was 54.3 people/km^{2} (141 people/mi^{2}). There were 53 housing units at an average density of 29.7 units/km^{2} (77 units/mi^{2}). The racial makeup of the town was 100.00% White. Hispanic or Latino of any race were 1.03% of the population.

There were 44 households, out of which 27.3% had children under the age of 18 living with them, 59.1% were married couples living together, 4.5% had a female householder with no husband present, and 29.5% were non-families. 29.5% of all households were made up of individuals, and 18.2% had someone living alone who was 65 years of age or older. The average household size was 2.20 and the average family size was 2.71.

In the town, the population was spread out, with 21.6% under the age of 18, 6.2% from 18 to 24, 26.8% from 25 to 44, 23.7% from 45 to 64, and 21.6% who were 65 years of age or older. The median age was 44 years. For every 100 females, there were 102.1 males. For every 100 females age 18 and over, there were 105.4 males.

The median income for a household in the town was $28,750, and the median income for a family was $34,375. Males had a median income of $26,250 versus $17,250 for females. The per capita income for the town was $12,790. There were no families and 8.0% of the population living below the poverty line, including no under eighteens and 41.2% of those over 64.

== Notable people ==
- Bill Rice - country music singer-songwriter
