= Tenmile Creek (Cane Creek tributary) =

Stream in the US state of Missouri

Tenmile Creek is a stream in Butler and Carter counties in the U.S. state of Missouri. It is a tributary of Cane Creek.

The stream headwaters are in Carter County at 36°55′42″N 90°48′45″W and the confluence with Cane Creek in Butler County is at 36°46′13″N 90°31′48″W.

Tenmile Creek is about 10 miles (16 km) long, hence the name.

== Tributaries ==
- Beehole Branch

== See also ==
- List of rivers of Missouri
