= Clay County, Arkansas =

County in Arkansas, United States

- County
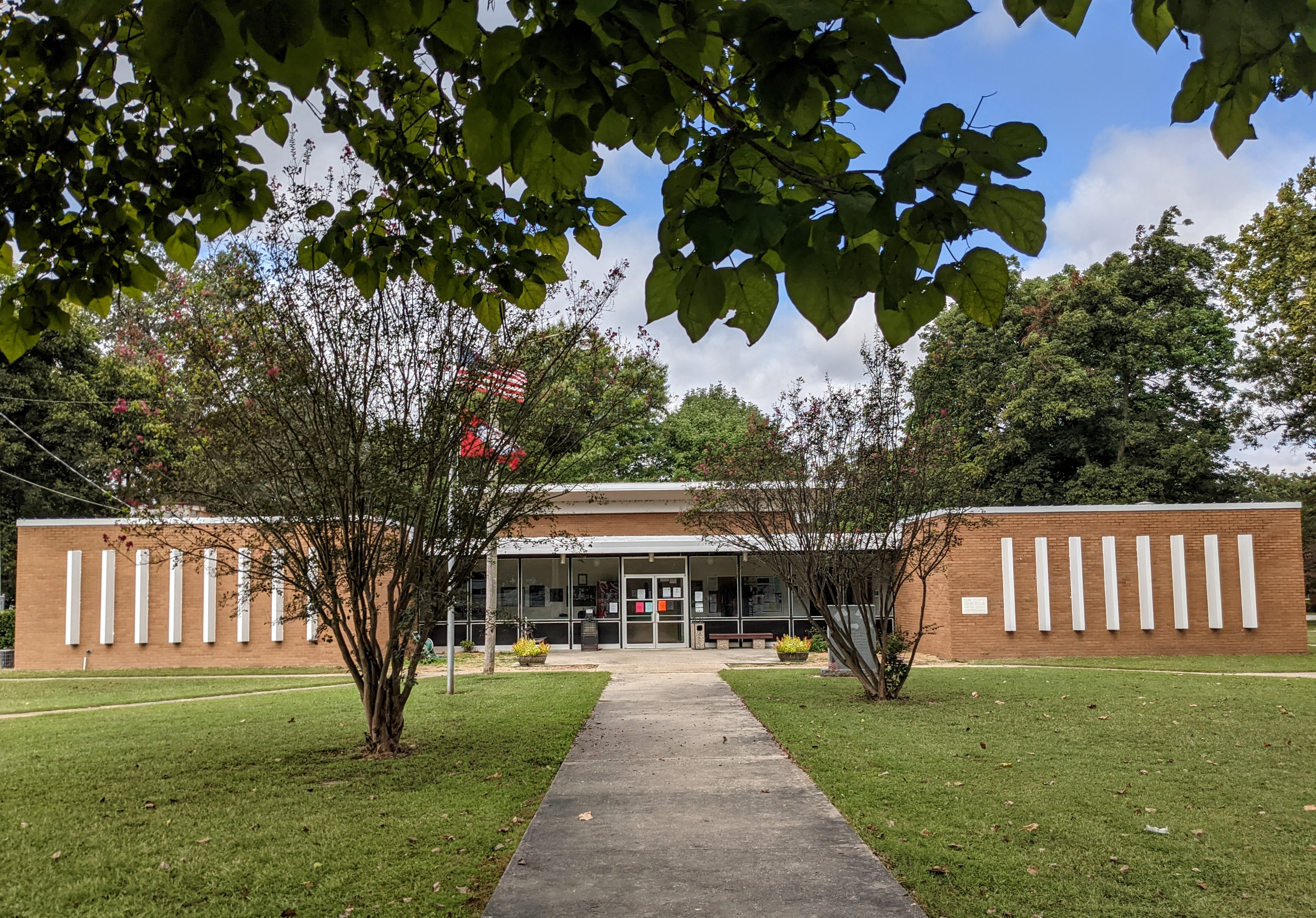
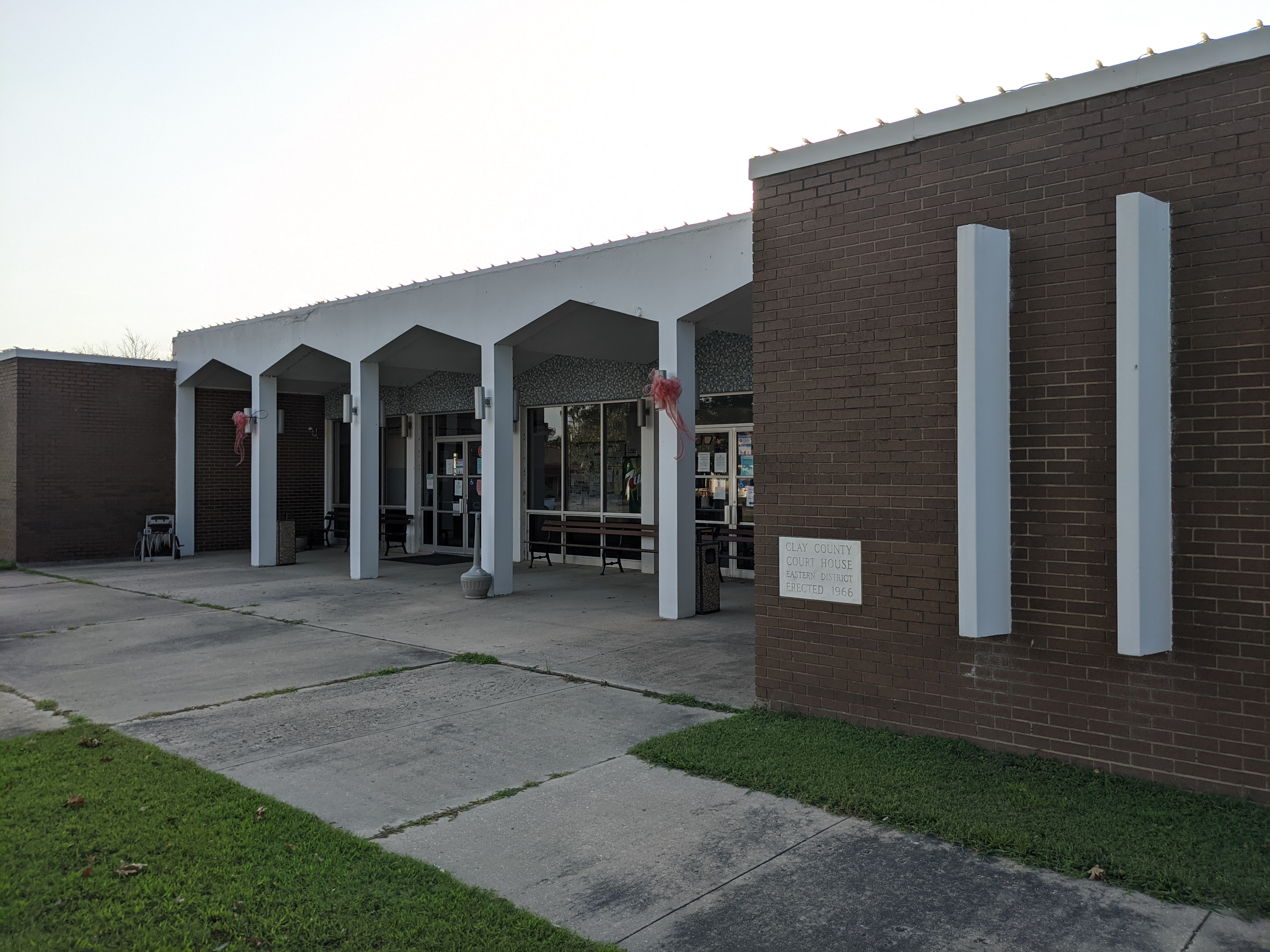
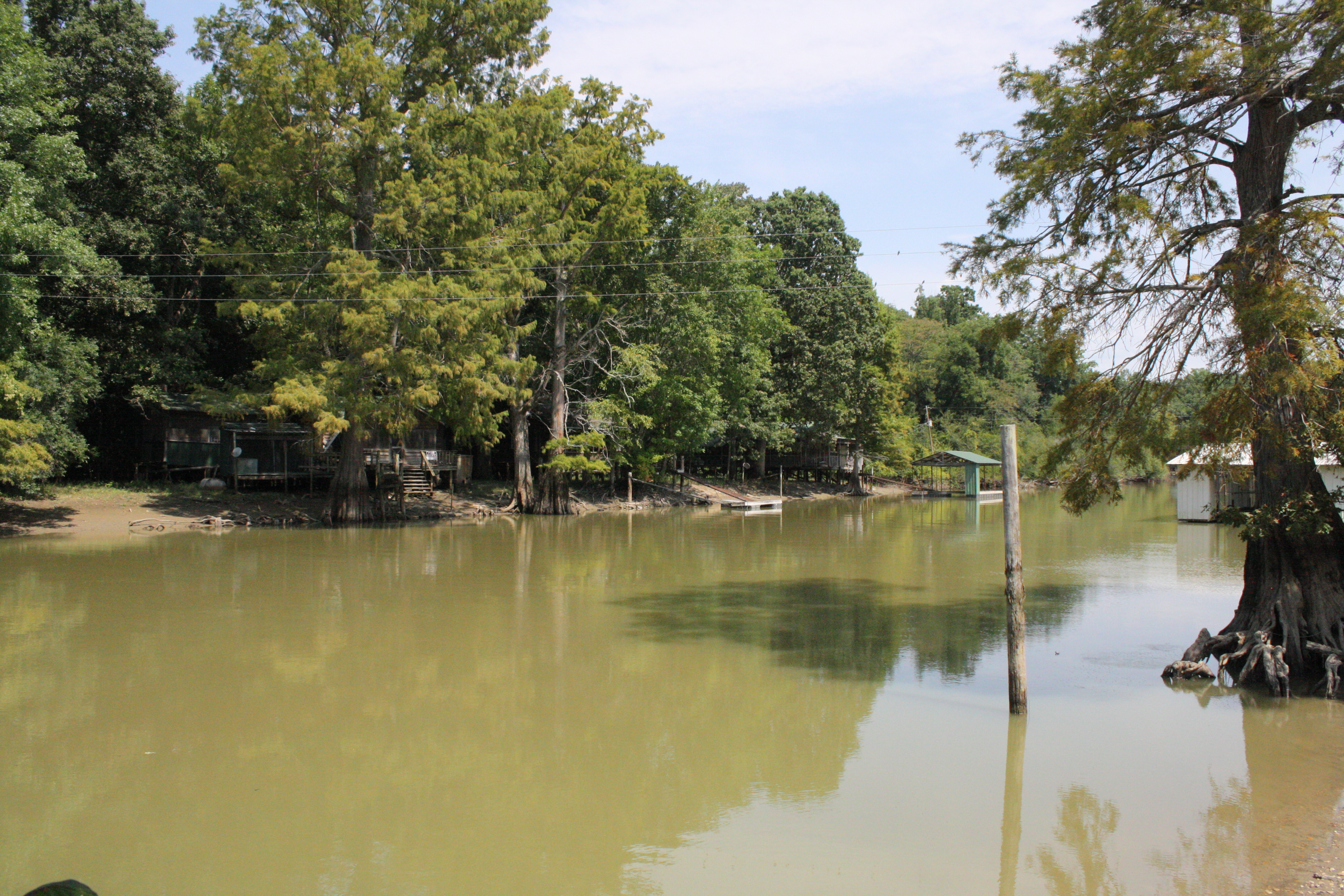
- Clockwise from top right: St. Francis River at Chalk Bluff Battlefield Park, Clay County Courthouse, Eastern District in Piggott, Rice field, Black River at Brookings, Clay County Courthouse, Western District in Corning, Soybean field

- Location within the U.S. state of Arkansas
- Coordinates: 36°22′39″N 90°26′07″W
- Country: United States
- State: Arkansas
- Founded: 24 March, 1873
- Seat: Corning (western district); Piggott (eastern district)
- Largest city: Piggott

Area
  - Total: 641 sq mi (1,660 km^{2})
  - Land: 639 sq mi (1,660 km^{2})
  - Water: 2.0 sq mi (5.2 km^{2}) 0.3%

Population (2020)
  - Total: 14,552
  - Estimate (2025): 14,052 ▼
  - Density: 22.8/sq mi (8.79/km^{2})
- Time zone: UTC−6 (Central)
  - Summer (DST): UTC−5 (CDT)
- Congressional district: 1st
- Website: www.claycountyarkansas.org

Clay County is a county located in the U.S. state of Arkansas. Originally incorporated as Clayton County, as of the 2020 United States census, its population was 14,552. The county has two county seats, Corning and Piggott. It is a dry county, in which the sale of alcoholic beverages is restricted or prohibited.

== History ==
When Clay County was created as Arkansas's 67th county on 24 March 1873 (along with Baxter County), it was named Clayton County after John M. Clayton, then a member of the Arkansas Senate and a brother of then-U.S. Senator Powell Clayton, though some sources suggest it may have been named for Powell Clayton instead.

Two years later on 6 December 1875, the county's name was shortened to "Clay" by the Arkansas General Assembly. Some claim it was renamed for the statesman Henry Clay, while others say John M. Clayton remained its official namesake. The name change apparently was inspired by lingering distrust of Powell Clayton, as he had declared martial law and suspended elections in the county in 1868 when he was Governor of Arkansas and it was still part of Greene County.

The first county seat was Corning, established in 1873, with the arrival of the St. Louis, Iron Mountain and Southern Railway, as the first incorporated town in the county. The county seat was moved to Boydsville in 1877, in what was known as "Old Bradshaw Field", because people living east of the Black and Cache Rivers had difficulty getting to Corning during the flood season. However, this caused problems for those living west of the rivers, and in 1881 Corning was re-established as the seat of the Western District, with Boydsville remaining the seat for the Eastern District. With the arrival of the St. Louis, Arkansas and Texas Railroad in 1882, other towns such as Greenway, Rector and Piggott experienced growth. In 1887, the Eastern District seat was moved to Piggott, and the dual county seat system remains in place today. Important county functions (such as the Quorum Court) alternate between Piggott and Corning as their venues.

In the early 20th century, Clay, Greene, and Craighead counties had sundown town policies forbidding African Americans from living in the area.

On 6 April 1972, Sheriff Douglas Batey and deputies Glen Ray Archer and Troy Key were shot and killed while trying to serve a warrant on Bert Grissom. Grissom opened fire as soon as the men stepped out of their car. He later surrendered without resistance to another deputy, and was tried, convicted, and sentenced to life in prison. William Thomas Pond became sheriff, but he died in an automobile accident on 8 June 1973. Four of the five police officers who have lost their lives serving the Clay County Sheriff's Office died in these two incidents.

== Geography ==
According to the U.S. Census Bureau, the county has a total area of 641 square miles (1,660 km^{2}), of which 639 square miles (1,660 km^{2}) is land and 2.0 square miles (5.2 km^{2}) (0.3%) is water.

Clay County is largely located in the Mississippi Alluvial Plain, a United States Environmental Protection Agency (EPA) Level III ecoregion more commonly known as the Arkansas Delta (in Arkansas, usually referred to as "the Delta"), a flat area consisting of rich, fertile sediment deposits from the Mississippi River between Louisiana and Illinois. The county is crossed from southwest to northeast by Crowley's Ridge, a disjunct part of the Mississippi Valley Loess Plains ecoregion containing loess-capped hills.

Soybean field (73g)

Within the Delta, western Clay County is largely located within the terraces of the Western Lowlands Pleistocene Valley Trains subregion. Physiography is widely muted by windblown silt deposits (loess), sand sheets, or sand dunes. Many interdunal depressions called "sandponds" occur and are either in contact with the water table or have a perched aquifer. Elevations are higher than adjacent Western Lowlands Holocene Meander Belts (73f) consequently, uplands are rarely if ever flooded. Native plant communities are different from more frequently inundated ecoregions; for example, post oak and loblolly pine are native. Today, cropland is extensive and the main crops are soybeans and cotton. Commercial crawfish, baitfish, and catfish farms are common. The ecoregion is a wintering ground for waterfowl. Duck hunting is widespread. A small strip along the Black River is located along the Western Lowlands Holocene Meander Belts (73f) ecoregion, a flat floodplain containing the meander belts, point bars, natural levees, swales, and abandoned channels of the river. Today, Ecoregion 73f contains some of the most extensive remaining tracts of native bottomland hardwood forest in the Mississippi Alluvial Plain; cropland also occurs. Flood control levees are less developed and riverine processes are more natural and dynamic.

=== Major highways ===
- Future Interstate 57
- U.S. Highway 49
- U.S. Highway 62
- U.S. Highway 67
- Highway 1
- Highway 90
- Highway 119
- Highway 135
- Highway 139
- Highway 141
- Highway 211
- Highway 280
- Highway 328

=== Adjacent counties ===
- Butler County, Missouri (north)
- Dunklin County, Missouri (east)
- Greene County (south)
- Randolph County (west)
- Ripley County, Missouri (northwest)

== Demographics ==
Historical population
Census	Pop.	Note	%±
1880	7,213		—
1890	12,200		69.1%
1900	15,886		30.2%
1910	23,690		49.1%
1920	27,276		15.1%
1930	27,278		0.0%
1940	28,386		4.1%
1950	26,674		−6.0%
1960	21,258		−20.3%
1970	18,771		−11.7%
1980	20,616		9.8%
1990	18,107		−12.2%
2000	17,609		−2.8%
2010	16,083		−8.7%
2020	14,552		−9.5%
2025 (est.)	14,052	▼	−3.4%
U.S. Decennial Census; 1790–1960 1900–1990; 1990–2000 2010

=== 2020 census ===
As of the 2020 census, the county had a population of 14,552. The median age was 43.9 years. 21.8% of residents were under the age of 18 and 22.0% of residents were 65 years of age or older. For every 100 females there were 93.9 males, and for every 100 females age 18 and over there were 93.2 males age 18 and over.

The racial makeup of the county was 94.4% White, 0.3% Black or African American, 0.3% American Indian and Alaska Native, 0.1% Asian, 0.1% Native Hawaiian and Pacific Islander, 0.7% from some other race, and 4.2% from two or more races. Hispanic or Latino residents of any race comprised 2.2% of the population.

Less than 0.1% of residents lived in urban areas, while 100.0% lived in rural areas.

There were 6,176 households in the county, of which 27.4% had children under the age of 18 living in them. Of all households, 46.5% were married-couple households, 19.6% were households with a male householder and no spouse or partner present, and 27.5% were households with a female householder and no spouse or partner present. About 31.5% of all households were made up of individuals and 16.3% had someone living alone who was 65 years of age or older.

There were 7,470 housing units, of which 17.3% were vacant. Among occupied housing units, 71.0% were owner-occupied and 29.0% were renter-occupied. The homeowner vacancy rate was 3.0% and the rental vacancy rate was 13.4%.

=== 2000 census ===
As of the 2000 census, there were 17,609 people, 7,417 households, and 5,073 families residing in the county. The population density was 28 people per square mile (11 people/km^{2}). There were 8,498 housing units at an average density of 13 per square mile (5.0/km^{2}). The racial makeup of the county was 98.1% White, 0.2% Black or African American, 0.7% Native American, 0.1% Asian, 0.2% from other races, and 0.1% from two or more races. 0.8% of the population were Hispanic or Latino of any race.

There were 7,417 households, out of which 28.3% had children under the age of 18 living with them, 56.6% were married couples living together, 8.6% had a female householder with no husband present, and 31.6% were non-families. 28.4% of all households were made up of individuals, and 16.7% had someone living alone who was 65 years of age or older. The average household size was 2.35 and the average family size was 2.87.

In the county, the population was spread out, with 23.1% under the age of 18, 7.7% from 18 to 24, 25.3% from 25 to 44, 24.6% from 45 to 64, and 19.4% who were 65 years of age or older. The median age was 40 years. For every 100 females there were 93.5 males. For every 100 females age 18 and over, there were 88.3 males.

The median income for a household in the county was $25,345, and the median income for a family was $32,558. Males had a median income of $24,375 versus $17,146 for females. The per capita income for the county was $14,512. About 13.4% of families and 17.5% of the population were below the poverty line, including 21.2% of those under age 18 and 22.7% of those age 65 or over.

== Government ==
=== County Government ===
The county government is a constitutional body granted specific powers by the Constitution of Arkansas and the Arkansas Code. The quorum court is the legislative branch of the county government and controls all spending and revenue collection. Representatives are called justices of the peace and are elected from county districts every even-numbered year. The number of districts in a county vary from nine to fifteen, and district boundaries are drawn by the county election commission. The Clay County Quorum Court has nine members. Presiding over quorum court meetings is the county judge, who serves as the chief executive officer of the county. The county judge is elected at-large and does not vote in quorum court business, although capable of vetoing quorum court decisions.

Clay County, Arkansas Elected countywide officials
Position	Officeholder	Party
County Judge	Mike Patterson	Republican
County Clerk	Tyler Wyss	Republican
Circuit Clerk	Angela Self	Republican
Sheriff/Collector	Ronnie Cole	Republican
Treasurer	Brande Boyd	Republican
Assessor	Tracy Gurley	Republican
Coroner	Jerrod Daniel Lowe	Republican

District Judge: David Copelin

The composition of the Quorum Court after the 2024 elections is 7 Republicans and 2 Democrats. Justices of the Peace (members) of the Quorum Court following the elections are:

- District 1: Neal Smith (R)
- District 2: Joseph C. Henderson (D)
- District 3: Patrick Patterson (R)
- District 4: D. David Cagle (R)
- District 5: Brad Green (R)
- District 6: Dennis Haines (R)
- District 7: Randy Kingston (R)
- District 8: George E. Lowe (D)
- District 9: David Hatcher (R)

Additionally, the townships of Clay County are entitled to elect their own respective constables, as set forth by the Constitution of Arkansas. Constables are largely of historical significance as they were used to keep the peace in rural areas when travel was more difficult. The township constables as of the 2024 elections are:

- Bennett & Lemmons: Jeff Bradish (R)
- Bradshaw & Haywood: Shain Casebier (R)
- Clark: James W. Harmon (R)
- Cleveland & North Kilgore: Michael Gleghorn (R)
- East Oak Bluff: James Todd Watson (R)
- Liddell & Chalk Bluff: Matthew Vancil (R)
- North St. Francis: Andrew Rathel (R)
- Payne & Swain: David Dean Taylor (R)
- Pollard: Rob Chandler (R)
- South St. Francis: Tim Boyd (R)
- West Oak Bluff: Terry Robertson (R)

=== Politics ===
While Clay County was once a Democratic stronghold, in recent decades it has swung hard towards the Republicans. The county voted Democratic in every presidential election from Reconstruction until 1960 with comfortable margins. It shifted back and forth during the latter part of the 20th century, with four Republican wins in 1960, 1968, 1972, and 1984. Since 1992, however, the county has shifted to the right in every presidential election. Flipping red in 2004, each successive Republican has garnered a greater share of the vote, culminating in Donald Trump's nearly 80% win in 2024, the highest share ever for a Republican candidate.

United States presidential election results for Clay County, Arkansas
Year	Republican		Democratic		Third party(ies)	
Year	No.	%	No.	%	No.	%
1896	475	23.35%	1,537	75.57%	22	1.08%
1900	627	34.15%	1,195	65.09%	14	0.76%
1904	752	42.03%	968	54.11%	69	3.86%
1908	1,009	38.08%	1,527	57.62%	114	4.30%
1912	622	24.91%	1,299	52.02%	576	23.07%
1916	973	33.29%	1,950	66.71%	0	0.00%
1920	1,536	43.99%	1,775	50.83%	181	5.18%
1924	1,084	39.85%	1,429	52.54%	207	7.61%
1928	1,254	46.31%	1,435	52.99%	19	0.70%
1932	397	17.22%	1,891	82.00%	18	0.78%
1936	795	30.83%	1,778	68.94%	6	0.23%
1940	1,029	37.03%	1,676	60.31%	74	2.66%
1944	1,422	42.31%	1,934	57.54%	5	0.15%
1948	878	28.41%	2,069	66.94%	144	4.66%
1952	2,105	47.75%	2,277	51.66%	26	0.59%
1956	1,711	41.60%	2,368	57.57%	34	0.83%
1960	2,543	55.67%	1,908	41.77%	117	2.56%
1964	1,999	37.57%	3,280	61.64%	42	0.79%
1968	2,410	37.91%	1,663	26.16%	2,285	35.94%
1972	4,381	69.39%	1,933	30.61%	0	0.00%
1976	1,893	25.05%	5,664	74.95%	0	0.00%
1980	3,091	42.17%	3,985	54.37%	254	3.47%
1984	3,767	53.02%	3,279	46.15%	59	0.83%
1988	2,766	44.33%	3,442	55.16%	32	0.51%
1992	1,647	23.26%	4,848	68.47%	585	8.26%
1996	1,512	25.79%	3,848	65.63%	503	8.58%
2000	2,254	38.20%	3,527	59.78%	119	2.02%
2004	2,759	45.26%	3,264	53.54%	73	1.20%
2008	3,032	55.02%	2,244	40.72%	235	4.26%
2012	3,225	63.11%	1,738	34.01%	147	2.88%
2016	3,781	72.71%	1,199	23.06%	220	4.23%
2020	4,086	78.83%	962	18.56%	135	2.60%
2024	3,968	79.89%	907	18.26%	92	1.85%

== Economy ==
Agriculture is the cornerstone of Clay County's economy. Farmers throughout the county grow a wide variety of crops. Rice is the dominant crop, but significant amounts of cotton, soybeans, corn, hay, and milo are also grown. Industry is limited to a handful of factories located in the cities of Piggott, Corning, and Rector.

== Education ==
Public education of elementary and secondary school students is provided by:

- Corning School District
- Greene County Tech School District
- Piggott School District
- Rector School District

== Communities ==
=== Cities ===
- Corning (county seat)
- Greenway
- Knobel
- Peach Orchard
- Piggott (county seat)
- Pollard
- Rector
- St. Francis

=== Towns ===
- Datto
- McDougal
- Nimmons
- Success

=== Unincorporated community ===
- Scatterville
- Moark
- Palatka

=== Townships ===
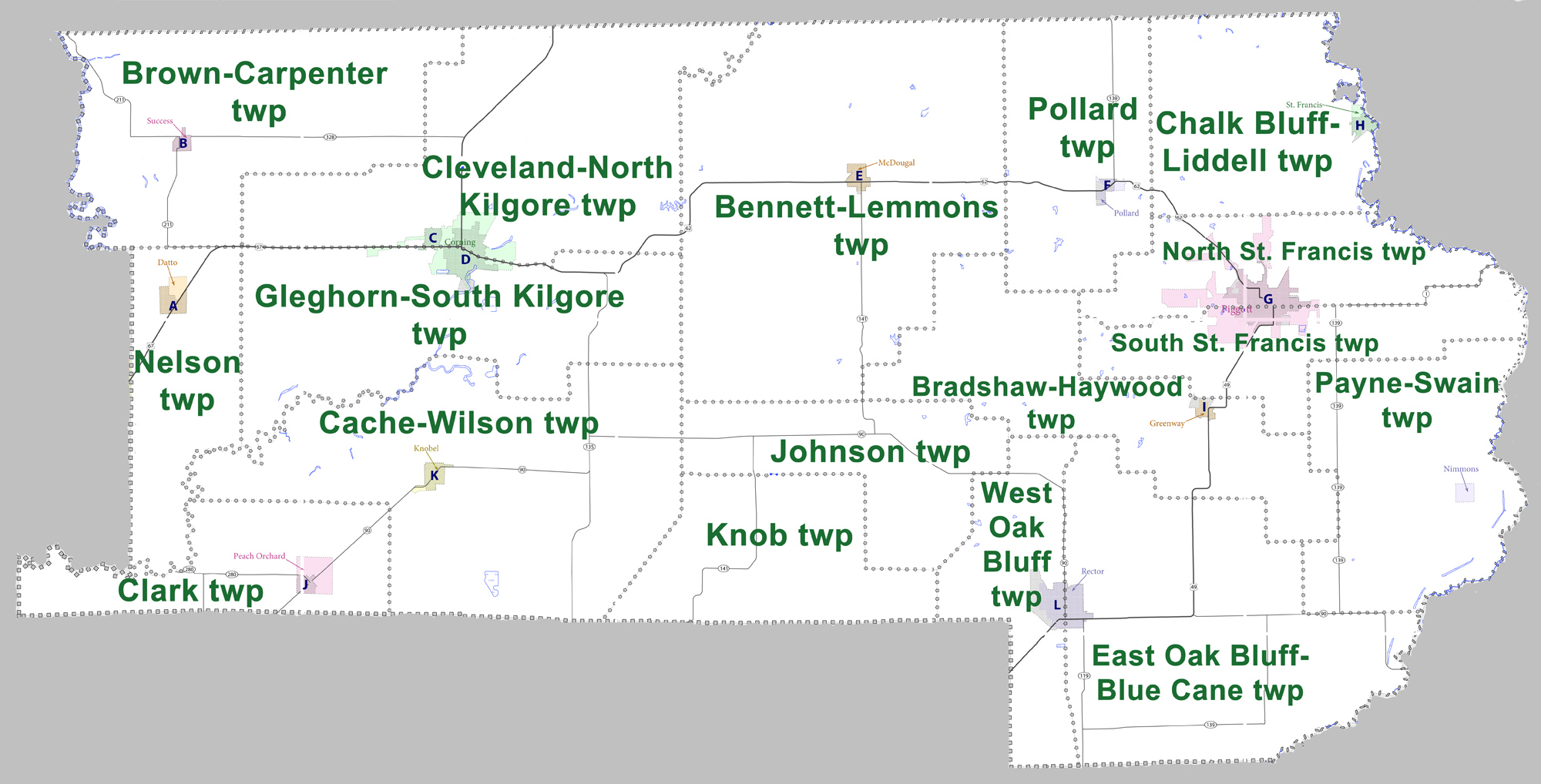
Townships in Clay County, Arkansas as of 2010

Townships in Arkansas are the divisions of a county. Each township includes unincorporated areas; some may have incorporated cities or towns within part of their boundaries. Arkansas townships have limited purposes in modern times. However, the United States census does list Arkansas population based on townships (sometimes referred to as "county subdivisions" or "minor civil divisions"). Townships are also of value for historical purposes in terms of genealogical research. Each town or city is within one or more townships in an Arkansas county based on census maps and publications. The townships of Clay County are listed below; listed in parentheses are the cities, towns, and/or census-designated places that are fully or partially inside the township.

- Bennett-Lemmons (McDougal)
- Bradshaw-Haywood (Greenway)
- Brown-Carpenter (Success)
- Cache-Wilson (Knobel)
- Chalk Bluff-Liddell (part of St. Francis)
- Clark (Peach Orchard)
- Cleveland-North Kilgore (part of Corning)
- East Oak Bluff-Blue Cane (part of Rector)
- Gleghorn-South Kilgore (part of Corning)
- Johnson
- Knob
- Nelson (Datto)
- North St. Francis (part of Piggott)
- Payne-Swain (Nimmons)
- Pollard (Pollard)
- South St. Francis (part of Piggott)
- West Oak Bluff (part of Rector)

== See also ==
- Battle of Chalk Bluff
- List of lakes in Clay County, Arkansas
- National Register of Historic Places listings in Clay County, Arkansas
- List of sundown towns in the United States
