= Corning, Arkansas =

- City
- West 2nd Street

- Location of Corning in Clay County, Arkansas.
- Coordinates: 36°24′48″N 90°35′03″W
- Country: United States
- State: Arkansas
- County: Clay
- Established: August 6, 1877

Government
  - Type: Mayor-council government
  - Mayor: Greg Ahrent

Area
  - Total: 3.70 sq mi (9.58 km^{2})
  - Land: 3.67 sq mi (9.51 km^{2})
  - Water: 0.031 sq mi (0.08 km^{2})
- Elevation: 292 ft (89 m)

Population (2020)
  - Total: 3,227
  - Estimate (2025): 3,065 ▼
  - Density: 879.1/sq mi (339.41/km^{2})
- Time zone: UTC-6 (Central (CST))
  - Summer (DST): UTC-5 (CDT)
- ZIP code: 72422
- Area code: 870
- FIPS code: 05-15460
- GNIS feature ID: 2404134
- Website: www.corningar.gov

Corning is a city in Clay County, Arkansas, United States. The population was 3,227 at the 2020 census. It is one of the two county seats of Clay County, along with Piggott.

== History ==
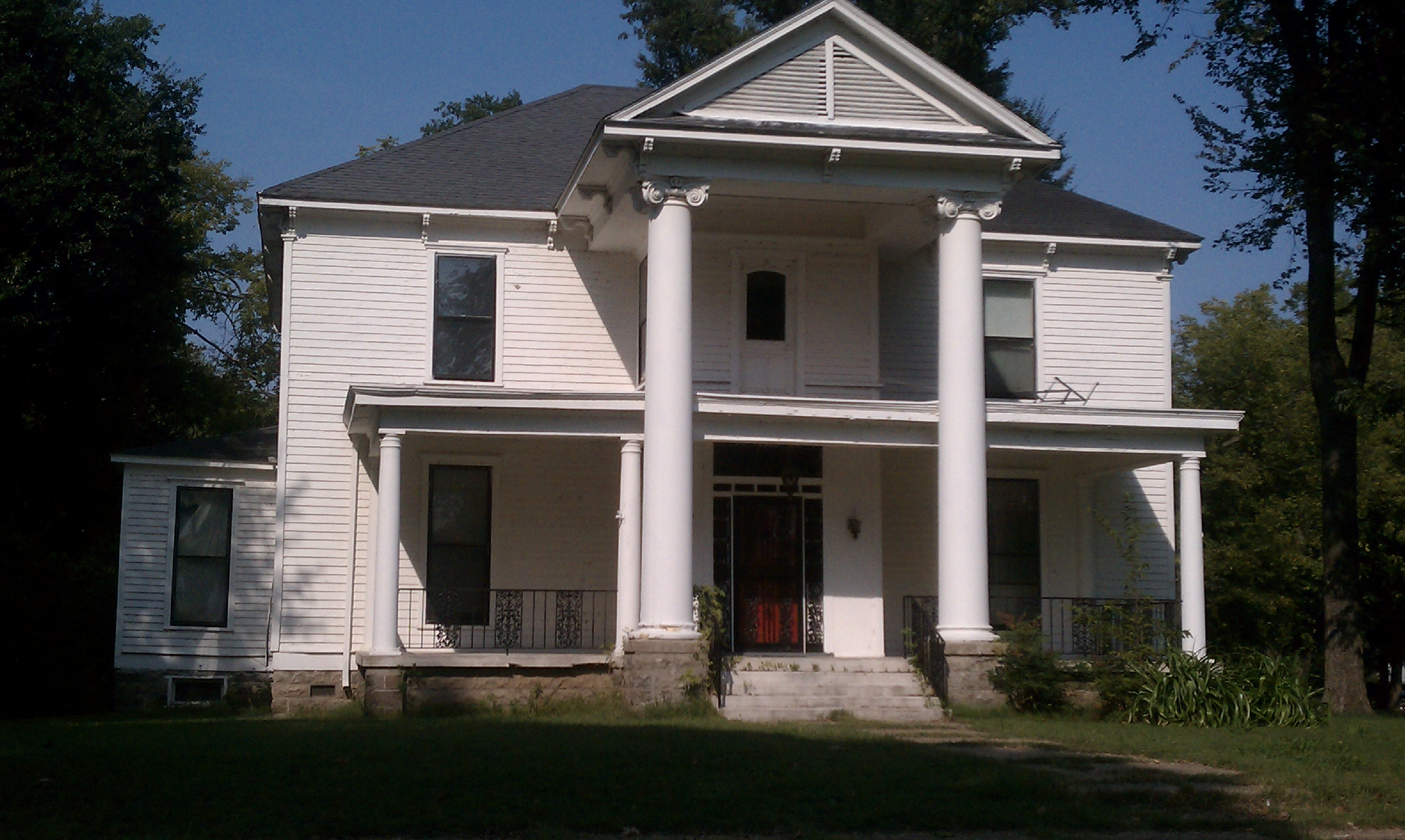
Historic Sheeks House

The original settlement was approximately one mile east and was called Hecht City, named for brothers Levi and Solomon Hecht, who operated a lumber mill on Black River. Hecht City moved to the present site of Corning in 1871, when the Cairo and Fulton Railroad surveyed the land for the proposed route. The railroad through the settlement was completed by 1872. On February 5, 1873, the name was changed from Hecht City to Corning, in honor of H. D. Corning, an engineer with the railroad.

The city of Corning experienced a massive period of growth in the early part of the 20th century. In the 1960s and 1970s, it was the site of many industrial manufacturing developments.

Corning was the site of a large explosion on March 9, 1966. The pre-dawn explosion originated in a munitions railcar and resulted in only one minor injury in the small town. The explosion was widely reported throughout the surrounding region.

Two properties in Corning are listed on the National Register of Historic Places: Sheeks House and Oliver House.

== Geography ==
Corning is located in western Clay County 2 miles (3 km) west of the Black River. U.S. Route 62 passes through the city, leading east 25 miles (40 km) to Piggott and southwest 26 miles (42 km) to Pocahontas. U.S. Route 67 leads north from Corning 29 miles (47 km) to Poplar Bluff, Missouri, and joins US 62 heading southwest out of Corning to Pocahontas.

According to the United States Census Bureau, Corning has a total area of 3.14 square miles (8.14 km^{2}), of which 3.12 square miles (8.08 km^{2}) is land and 0.03 square miles (0.07 km^{2}), or 0.81%, is water.

The topography of Corning is flat, having previously been marshland. Area farmers and builders may attest to this due to the proliferation of gumbo soil, a name given to soil high in clay particulate matter and common in the region.

== Climate ==
The climate in this area is characterized by hot, humid summers and generally mild to cold winters. According to the Köppen Climate Classification system, Corning has a humid subtropical climate, abbreviated "Cfa" on climate maps.

According to the Köppen Climate Classification system, has a humid subtropical climate, abbreviated "Cfa" on climate maps. The hottest temperature recorded in Corning was 113 °F (45.0 °C) on August 8–9, 1934 and June 20, 1936, while the coldest temperature recorded was −25 °F (−31.7 °C) on February 12, 1899.

On January 22, 1918, Corning set the record for the highest 24-hour snowfall recorded in Arkansas at 25 inches.

Climate data for Corning, Arkansas, 1991–2020 normals, extremes 1893–present
Month	Jan	Feb	Mar	Apr	May	Jun	Jul	Aug	Sep	Oct	Nov	Dec	Year
Record high °F (°C)	79 (26)	84 (29)	94 (34)	95 (35)	101 (38)	113 (45)	111 (44)	113 (45)	107 (42)	98 (37)	87 (31)	78 (26)	113 (45)
Mean maximum °F (°C)	65.8 (18.8)	70.7 (21.5)	77.9 (25.5)	84.5 (29.2)	90.1 (32.3)	95.3 (35.2)	97.4 (36.3)	97.2 (36.2)	93.6 (34.2)	86.9 (30.5)	76.5 (24.7)	67.1 (19.5)	99.2 (37.3)
Mean daily maximum °F (°C)	44.7 (7.1)	50.1 (10.1)	59.7 (15.4)	70.6 (21.4)	79.1 (26.2)	87.1 (30.6)	89.7 (32.1)	88.7 (31.5)	82.7 (28.2)	72.2 (22.3)	58.4 (14.7)	47.8 (8.8)	69.2 (20.7)
Daily mean °F (°C)	36.4 (2.4)	40.9 (4.9)	49.8 (9.9)	60.0 (15.6)	69.4 (20.8)	77.5 (25.3)	80.4 (26.9)	78.7 (25.9)	71.6 (22.0)	60.6 (15.9)	48.8 (9.3)	39.7 (4.3)	59.5 (15.3)
Mean daily minimum °F (°C)	28.2 (−2.1)	31.7 (−0.2)	40.0 (4.4)	49.5 (9.7)	59.6 (15.3)	67.9 (19.9)	71.1 (21.7)	68.7 (20.4)	60.4 (15.8)	49.0 (9.4)	39.2 (4.0)	31.5 (−0.3)	49.7 (9.8)
Mean minimum °F (°C)	11.8 (−11.2)	14.9 (−9.5)	22.6 (−5.2)	34.3 (1.3)	44.2 (6.8)	56.8 (13.8)	62.4 (16.9)	58.6 (14.8)	45.7 (7.6)	33.5 (0.8)	24.5 (−4.2)	16.2 (−8.8)	8.4 (−13.1)
Record low °F (°C)	−21 (−29)	−25 (−32)	5 (−15)	22 (−6)	35 (2)	44 (7)	40 (4)	43 (6)	28 (−2)	21 (−6)	9 (−13)	−9 (−23)	−25 (−32)
Average precipitation inches (mm)	3.32 (84)	3.74 (95)	4.74 (120)	5.48 (139)	5.09 (129)	3.87 (98)	4.01 (102)	3.29 (84)	3.34 (85)	3.72 (94)	4.56 (116)	4.33 (110)	49.49 (1,256)
Average snowfall inches (cm)	0.9 (2.3)	2.2 (5.6)	0.5 (1.3)	0.0 (0.0)	0.0 (0.0)	0.0 (0.0)	0.0 (0.0)	0.0 (0.0)	0.0 (0.0)	0.0 (0.0)	0.2 (0.51)	0.8 (2.0)	4.6 (11.71)
Average precipitation days (≥ 0.01 in)	8.0	8.6	9.9	9.6	10.6	7.8	8.1	7.5	5.8	8.2	8.3	9.1	101.5
Average snowy days (≥ 0.1 in)	0.8	0.8	0.4	0.0	0.0	0.0	0.0	0.0	0.0	0.0	0.1	0.7	2.8
Source 1: NOAA
Source 2: National Weather Service

== Demographics ==
Historical population
Census	Pop.	Note	%±
1880	393		—
1890	584		48.6%
1900	1,041		78.3%
1910	1,439		38.2%
1920	1,564		8.7%
1930	1,550		−0.9%
1940	1,619		4.5%
1950	2,045		26.3%
1960	2,192		7.2%
1970	2,705		23.4%
1980	3,650		34.9%
1990	3,323		−9.0%
2000	3,679		10.7%
2010	3,377		−8.2%
2020	3,227		−4.4%
2025 (est.)	3,065	▼	−5.0%
U.S. Decennial Census; 2014 Estimate

=== 2020 census ===
As of the 2020 census, there were 3,227 people, 1,364 households, and 934 families residing in the city.

The median age was 40.9 years. 23.2% of residents were under the age of 18 and 20.5% were 65 years of age or older. For every 100 females, there were 87.4 males, and for every 100 females age 18 and over there were 87.9 males.

0.0% of residents lived in urban areas, while 100.0% lived in rural areas.

There were 1,600 housing units, of which 14.8% were vacant. The homeowner vacancy rate was 4.0% and the rental vacancy rate was 14.7%.

There were 1,364 households, of which 29.5% had children under the age of 18 living in them. Of all households, 42.5% were married-couple households, 19.0% were households with a male householder and no spouse or partner present, and 31.0% were households with a female householder and no spouse or partner present. About 33.0% of all households were made up of individuals, and 15.7% had someone living alone who was 65 years of age or older.

Corning racial composition
Race	Number	Percentage
White (non-Hispanic)	2,999	92.93%
Black or African American (non-Hispanic)	4	0.12%
Native American	10	0.31%
Asian	5	0.15%
Other/Mixed	132	4.09%
Hispanic or Latino	77	2.39%

=== 2000 census ===
As of the census of 2000, there were 3,679 people, 1,553 households, and 1,018 families residing in the city. The population density was 1,150.0 inhabitants per square mile (444.0/km^{2}). There were 1,722 housing units at an average density of 538.2 per square mile (207.8/km^{2}). The racial makeup of the city was 97.77% White, 0.33% Black or African American, 0.60% Native American, 0.24% Asian, 0.11% from other races, and 0.95% from two or more races. 0.38% of the population was Hispanic or Latino of any race.

There were 1,553 households, out of which 27.9% had children under the age of 18 living with them, 51.6% were married couples living together, 10.5% had a female householder with no husband present, and 34.4% were non-families. 30.7% of all households were made up of individuals, and 18.2% had someone living alone who was 65 years of age or older. The average household size was 2.32, and the average family size was 2.88.

In the city, the population was spread out, with 23.3% under the age of 18, 8.9% from 18 to 24, 25.9% from 25 to 44, 22.0% from 45 to 64, and 19.9% who were 65 years of age or older. The median age was 39 years. For every 100 females, there were 88.8 males. For every 100 females age 18 and over, there were 82.5 males.

The median income for a household in the city was $21,200, and the median income for a family was $29,485. Males had a median income of $22,095 versus $16,383 for females. The per capita income for the city was $12,953. About 18.9% of families and 23.2% of the population were below the poverty line, including 29.0% of those under age 18 and 29.6% of those age 65 or over.

== Education ==
Public education for elementary and secondary students is provided by the Corning School District. Corning High School is a member of the Arkansas Activities Association. Programs include Art, Band, Spanish, Computer Tech, and Family and Consumer Sciences, along with other basic classes provided by public schools in the state. The school district’s mascot is the bobcat.

Corning has always prided itself on its high school sports programs. Currently, the school has boys' football, track, basketball, golf, baseball, and trap shooting. Girls' programs include basketball, softball, track, and golf. The high school football program has enjoyed dominance at times, such as when the team went undefeated in 2007 and made it to the second round of the state playoffs. Also successful, the varsity girls' basketball team played in the state Division 3A playoffs in 2009, 2010, and 2011.

== Agriculture ==
Industry in Corning is dominated by agriculture-related industries, such as farm equipment sales, farm equipment repair, seed processing and sales, and fertilizer and chemicals production. Forestry was a primary industry in the late 1800s and into the early 1900s but gave way to farming of rice, soybeans, hard red winter wheat, corn and other grains.

== Notable people ==
- Jack Ladyman, Republican member of the Arkansas House of Representatives from Jonesboro; former Corning resident
- W. Stephen Smith, Northwestern University Professor of Voice; voice teacher and author
