= Piggott High School =

Location
- 429 East Main Street; Piggott, Arkansas 72454; United States; 36°22′51″N 90°10′45″W

Information
- School type: Public (government funded)
- Status: Open
- School district: Piggott School District
- NCES District ID: 0511370
- Authority: Arkansas Department of Education (ADE)
- CEEB code: 042005
- NCES School ID: 051137000852
- Teaching staff: 54.50 (FTE) (on FTE basis)
- Grades: 7–12
- Enrollment: 343 (2023–2024)
- Student to teacher ratio: 6.29
- Education system: ADE Smart Core curriculum
- Classes offered: Regular, Advanced Placement
- Campus type: Rural
- Colors: Red and black
- Athletics: Football, Volleyball, Golf, Cross Country, Basketball, Tennis, Baseball, Softball, Track & Field, Cheer
- Athletics conference: 3A Region 3 (2012–14)
- Mascot: Mohawk
- Team name: Piggott Mohawks
- Rival: Corning High School (Known as the "Rice Bowl")
- Accreditation: ADE; AdvancED (1958–)
- Yearbook: The Mohawk
- Affiliation: Arkansas Activities Association
- Website: www.piggottschools.net

Piggott High School is an accredited comprehensive public high school serving students in grades seven through twelve in the rural community of Piggott, Arkansas, United States. It is one of three public high schools located in Clay County and serves the communities of Piggott, Greenway, Pollard, Rector, Nimmons, Saint Francis, and Corning. With more than 450 students, it is the sole high school of the Piggott School District.

== Academics ==
The school is accredited by the Arkansas Department of Education (ADE) and has been accredited by AdvancED since 1958. The assumed course of study follows the Smart Core curriculum developed the Arkansas Department of Education (ADE), which requires students to complete at least 24 credit units before graduation. Students engage in regular (core) and career focus courses and exams and may select Advanced Placement (AP) coursework and exams that may lead to college credit.

== Athletics ==
The Piggott Mohawks participate in various interscholastic activities in the 3A Classification within the 3A Region 3 Conference as administered by the Arkansas Activities Association.

PHS Mohawk activities include Football, Volleyball, Marching Band (boys/girls), Cross Country (boys/girls), Golf (boys/girls), Basketball (boys/girls), Baseball, Softball, Cheer, Tennis (boys/girls), and Track and Field (boys/girls).

- Golf: The boys golf team are 2-time state golf champions (1981, 1982).
- Track and field: The boys track team are 2-time state track and field champions (1937, 1938).
- Tennis: The boys tennis team are 2-time state tennis champions (2012, 2022).

The "Rice Bowl" is the annual football matchup against Clay County rival, Corning High School. Played since 1928, it is one of the oldest rivalries in Arkansas.
