= Esso Station =

An Esso station is an automotive service station operated by Esso. Notable former or existing Esso stations include:

== United States ==
- Jones General Store and Esso Station, Langley, Arkansas
- Esso Standard Oil Service Station (Little Rock, Arkansas)
- Esso Station (Piggott), Arkansas
- Esso Station (Clemson, South Carolina)
- Esso Station (Fayetteville, West Virginia)
- Esso Station (Winchester, Virginia)

== Canada ==
- Esso Station (Montreal)
