= National Register of Historic Places listings in Clay County, Arkansas =

Location of Clay County in Arkansas

This is a list of the National Register of Historic Places listings in Clay County, Arkansas.

This is intended to be a complete list of the properties and districts on the National Register of Historic Places in Clay County, Arkansas, United States. The locations of National Register properties and districts for which the latitude and longitude coordinates are included below, may be seen in a map.

There are 17 properties and districts listed on the National Register in the county, and three former listings.

Contents: Counties in Arkansas
- Arkansas
- Ashley
- Baxter
- Benton
- Boone
- Bradley
- Calhoun
- Carroll
- Chicot
- Clark
- Clay
- Cleburne
- Cleveland
- Columbia
- Conway
- Craighead
- Crawford
- Crittenden
- Cross
- Dallas
- Desha
- Drew
- Faulkner
- Franklin
- Fulton
- Garland
- Grant
- Greene
- Hempstead
- Hot Spring
- Howard
- Independence
- Izard
- Jackson
- Jefferson
- Johnson
- Lafayette
- Lawrence
- Lee
- Lincoln
- Little River
- Logan
- Lonoke
- Madison
- Marion
- Miller
- Mississippi
- Monroe
- Montgomery
- Nevada
- Newton
- Ouachita
- Perry
- Phillips
- Pike
- Poinsett
- Polk
- Pope
- Prairie
- Pulaski (Little Rock)
- Randolph
- St. Francis
- Saline
- Scott
- Searcy
- Sebastian
- Sevier
- Sharp
- Stone
- Union
- Van Buren
- Washington
- White
- Woodruff
- Yell

This National Park Service list is complete through NPS recent listings posted December 19, 2025.

== Current listings ==
	Name on the Register	Image	Date listed	Location	City or town	Description
1	Chalk Bluff	Chalk Bluff	October 29, 1974 (#74000470)	North of St. Francis; 36°28′41″N 90°09′32″W	St. Francis	
2	Clay County Courthouse, Eastern District	Clay County Courthouse, Eastern District	September 19, 2018 (#100002945)	151 S 2nd Ave. 36°22′56″N 90°11′32″W	Piggott	
3	Clay County Courthouse, Western District	Clay County Courthouse, Western District	September 18, 2018 (#100002946)	800 W 2nd St. 36°24′15″N 90°35′04″W	Corning	
4	County Home Cemetery	County Home Cemetery	March 22, 2005 (#04001495)	3010 Heritage Park Rd. 36°23′11″N 90°12′39″W	Piggott	
5	Eastern Star Lodge 207 F&AM	Eastern Star Lodge 207 F&AM	October 4, 2002 (#02001074)	Approximately 1.5 miles west on County Road 336, then 0.5 miles south Cty Rte. 347; 36°27′05″N 90°10′31″W	St. Francis	
6	Knob School-Masonic Lodge	Knob School-Masonic Lodge	May 30, 1991 (#91000679)	Highway 141; 36°16′53″N 90°27′00″W	Knob	
7	Old US 67, Biggers to Datto	Old US 67, Biggers to Datto	September 24, 2004 (#04001046)	Biggers-Reyno Rd., 1st St., and County Road 111; 36°21′35″N 90°46′37″W	Datto	Extends into Randolph County
8	Oliver House	Oliver House	December 8, 1978 (#78000578)	203 W. Front St. 36°24′35″N 90°34′44″W	Corning	
9	Pfeiffer House and Carriage House	Pfeiffer House and Carriage House	June 10, 1982 (#82002097)	10th and Cherry Sts. 36°23′04″N 90°12′00″W	Piggott	
10	Piggott Commercial Historic District	Piggott Commercial Historic District	November 4, 2009 (#09000867)	Roughly bounded on the north by W. Cherry, on the south by W. Court, on the east by S. Throckmorton, and on the west by Clay; 36°22′58″N 90°11′26″W	Piggott	
11	Piggott National Guard Armory	Piggott National Guard Armory	May 31, 2006 (#06000440)	775 E. Main St. 36°22′59″N 90°10′53″W	Piggott	
12	Piggott Post Office	Piggott Post Office	August 14, 1998 (#98000917)	119 N. 3rd St. 36°23′00″N 90°11′33″W	Piggott	
13	Rector Commercial Historic District	Rector Commercial Historic District	June 1, 2009 (#09000369)	Bounded by the former St. Louis Southwestern Railway railroad tracks on the east and south, S. Dodd on the west, and 3rd St. on the north 36°15′49″N 90°17′34″W	Rector	
14	Rector Waterworks Building	Rector Waterworks Building	May 12, 2009 (#09000312)	703 S. Main St. 36°15′39″N 90°17′34″W	Rector	
15	Scatterville Cemetery	Scatterville Cemetery	March 31, 1995 (#95000364)	County Road 404, 1.5 miles west of Highway 90; 36°16′55″N 90°18′47″W	Rector	
16	Sheeks House	Sheeks House	August 22, 1975 (#75000376)	502 Market St. 36°24′18″N 90°35′02″W	Corning	
17	Sink-Crumb Post No. 72 American Legion Hut	Sink-Crumb Post No. 72 American Legion Hut	September 25, 2008 (#08000934)	Northeastern corner of the junction of 2nd and Cherry Sts. 36°19′13″N 90°36′01″W	Knobel	

== Former listings ==
	Name on the Register	Image	Date listed	Date removed	Location	City or town	Description
1	Baynham House	Baynham House	August 31, 1978 (#78000579)	May 5, 2025	Stephens St. 36°27′05″N 90°43′29″W	Success	Structure no longer exists, 9/2020
2	Esso Station	Esso Station	June 2, 2000 (#00000604)	January 2, 2024	287 E Main; 36°22′34″N 90°11′16″W	Piggott	Demolished sometime after April 2016
3	Waddle House		March 28, 1977 (#77000246)	May 5, 2025	S. Erwin; 36°27′04″N 90°43′21″W	Success	Structure no longer exists, 9/2020

== See also ==
- List of National Historic Landmarks in Arkansas
- National Register of Historic Places listings in Arkansas
