= Allan Pruett =

American basketball player

Personal information
- Born: June 8, 1948 Jonesboro, Arkansas, U.S.
- Died: December 6, 2008 (aged 60) San Antonio, Texas, U.S.
- Listed height: 6 ft 0 in (1.83 m)

Career information
- High school: Rector (Rector, Arkansas)
- College: Mississippi State (1967–1968); Arkansas State (1969–1971)
- NBA draft: 1971: undrafted
- Position: Guard

Career highlights
- Southland Player of the Year (1971); First-team All-Southland (1971); Second-team All-Southland (1970)

Allan K. Pruett (June 8, 1948 – December 6, 2008) was an American basketball player. He played college basketball for the Mississippi State Bulldogs and Arkansas State Indians.

Born in Jonesboro, Arkansas, Pruett was raised in Rector, Arkansas, and attended Rector High School. He scored 2,018 points during his high school career and ranks third in scoring in Arkansas boys high school basketball history.

Pruett began his collegiate career with the Mississippi State Bulldogs in 1966. Pruett transferred to play for the Arkansas State Indians in 1969, where he averaged 17.1 points per game and was named to the second-team All-Southland Conference during his first season. He averaged 19.5 points per game during the 1970–71 season and was selected as the Southland Player of the Year alongside Luke Adams of the Lamar Cardinals. He was also named as a member of the first-team All-Southland.

Pruett worked as a special education vocational teacher in the San Antonio Independent School District for 18 years. He died on December 6, 2008, in San Antonio, Texas.
