= County Home Cemetery =

Historic cemetery in Arkansas, United States

- U.S. National Register of Historic Places
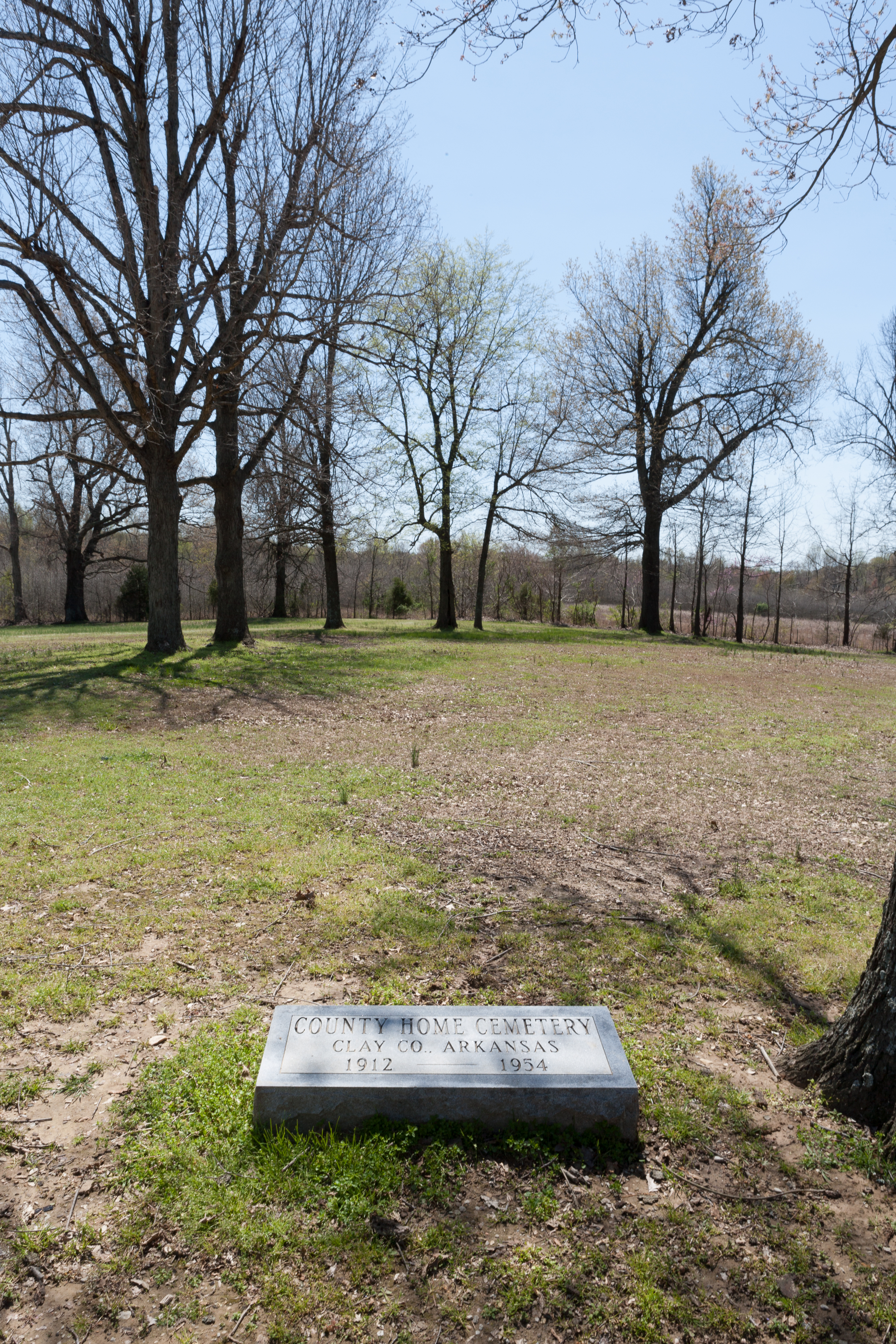

- Location within Arkansas Location within the United States
- Location: 3010 Heritage Park Rd., Piggott, Arkansas
- Coordinates: 36°23′11″N 90°12′39″W
- Area: 1.1 acres (0.45 ha)
- Built: 1912
- NRHP reference No.: 04001495
- Added to NRHP: March 22, 2005

The County Home Cemetery is a historic cemetery in Heritage Park, on Heritage Park Road in Piggott, Arkansas. The cemetery occupies about 1.1 acres (0.45 ha) in the center of the park, and is marked by a monument and bench. The park and cemetery are located on the former site of the Clay County poor house, built in 1911. The cemetery contains approximately sixty graves, many unmarked, of indigents who died at the home. The buildings of the facility were demolished in 1954, and the cemetery is the principal tangible reminder of its existence.

The cemetery was listed on the National Register of Historic Places in 2005.

== See also ==
- National Register of Historic Places listings in Clay County, Arkansas
