= Piggott Post Office =

- U.S. National Register of Historic Places
- U.S. Historic district – Contributing property
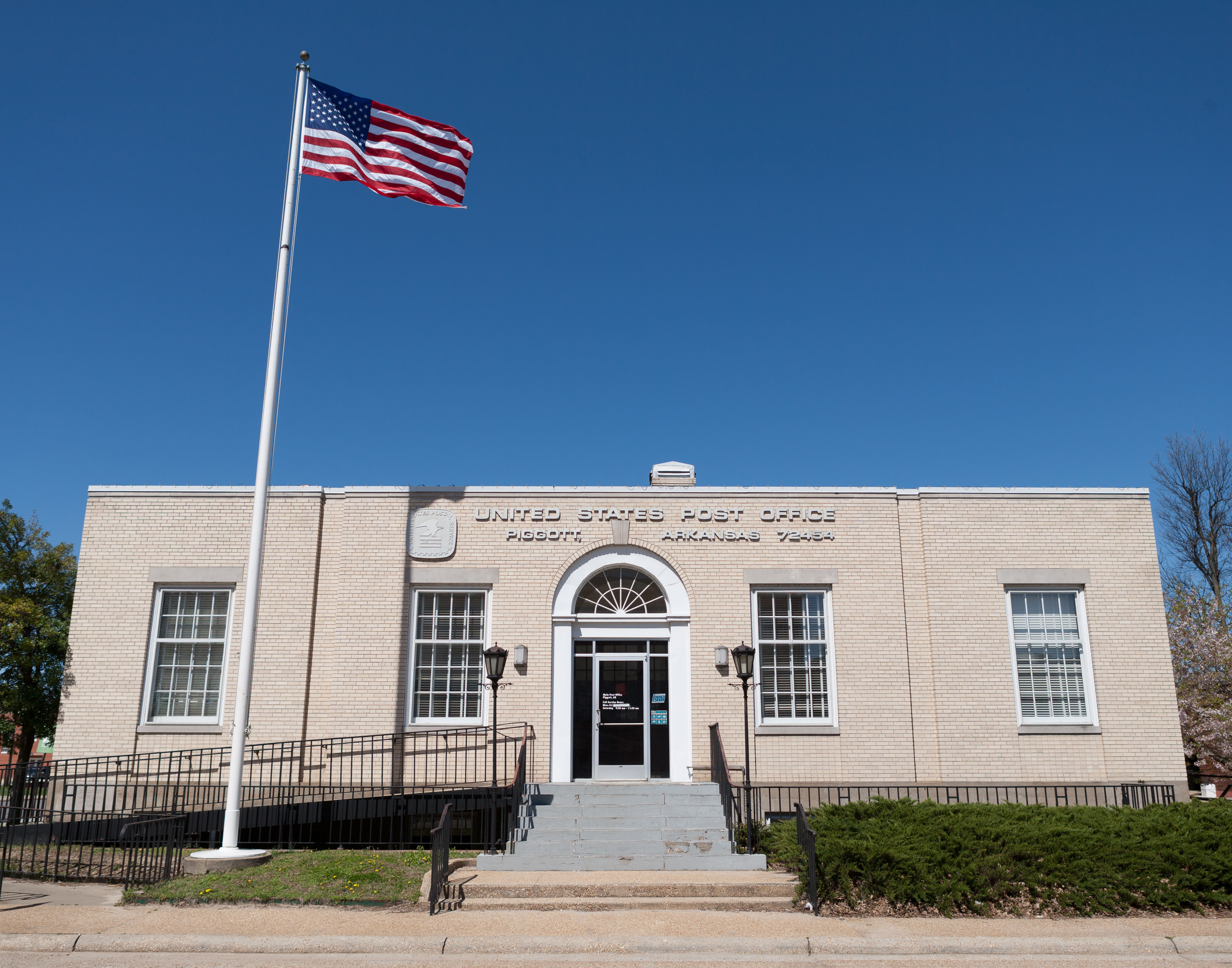

- Location within Arkansas Location within the United States
- Location: 119 N. Third St., Piggott, Arkansas
- Coordinates: 36°23′0″N 90°11′33″W
- Area: less than one acre
- Built: 1937
- Architect: Dan Rhodes, Louis A. Simon
- Architectural style: Colonial Revival
- Part of: Piggott Commercial Historic District (ID09000867)
- MPS: Post Offices with Section Art in Arkansas MPS
- NRHP reference No.: 98000917

Significant dates
- Added to NRHP: August 14, 1998
- Designated CP: November 4, 2009

The Piggott Post Office is located at 119 North 3rd Street in central Piggott, Arkansas. It is a single-story brick building, with a flat roof that has an encircling parapet, and a concrete foundation. Construction on the building took place mostly in 1937, but was not completed until 1941. The building is noted for its lobby murals, painted by Iowa native Dan Rhodes, with funding from the United States Treasury Department's Section of Fine Arts, a Depression-era jobs program for artists. The murals depict air mail postal service.

The building was listed on the National Register of Historic Places in 1998.

== See also ==
- National Register of Historic Places listings in Clay County, Arkansas
- List of United States post offices
- List of United States post office murals
