= Scatterville, Arkansas =

Former unincorporated community in Clay County, Arkansas

- Unincorporated community
- Interactive map of Scatterville, Arkansas
- Coordinates: 36.282°N 90.315°W
- Country: United States
- State: Arkansas

Scatterville is a former unincorporated community in Clay County, Arkansas, United States, approximately 2 mi (3 km) northwest of Rector. All that is left of the community today is the Scatterville Cemetery. The community occupied a strategic location along Crowley's Ridge and was often referred to in the reports of Union and Confederate forces vying for control of Northeast Arkansas during the American Civil War.

== History ==
Scatterville was one of the first Clay County communities, defined by having five or six families settled in a five-mile (8 km) area. Scatterville received its name because:

. . . one man put a store at the foot of a hill, another put one at the peak, still another put one at the foot on the other side. The few stores and cabins were scattered about over the hills in a careless way.

The first families to locate in the Scatterville community were the McNiels, Allens, Copelands, Mobleys, Snowdens, Waddells, Nortens, Mitchells, Golbys, Whites, Bradshaws, Deans, Rayburns, Whitakers, and Simmons. They were mainly subsistence farmers; however, the Allen, Knight, Simmon, Bradshaw, McNiel, and Mobley families brought a few slaves with them when they emigrated from Kentucky and Tennessee. Cotton was grown during the antebellum period, but it was only used to make clothing for personal use. A gin in Scatterville eased this task somewhat by removing the seeds from the boll. After the war, cotton was raised as a cash crop. In 1855, the first horse-powered sawmill was brought to Scatterville, and a frame school building was erected in 1859. In that same year the town welcomed Major Rayburn's new steam-powered sawmill. Other industries in Scatterville included a tanyard for shoe making and a hand-powered sorghum mill.

=== Civil War ===
During the American Civil War, both Union and Confederate forces operated in the area.

On March 23, 1862, Union Col. John McNiel reported that "There are about 1,000 men at Gainesville and Scatterville, on Crowleys Ridge. They are badly armed and scattered, in order to subsist."

On March 24, 1863, Union Col. John McNiel reported that "From 400 to 700 of Jeffers and Clarks men are scattered along from Chalk Bluff to Scatterville and Gainesville."

On March 28, 1863, a detachment of the 1st Wisconison Cavalry Regiment passed through Scatterville in pursuit of a Confederate force under Col Preston, said to be in the area with 400 men.

On July 21, 1863, Confederate Colonel S. G. Kitchens of the 10th Missouri Cavalry reported that a Union force of 350 was camped three miles south of Scatterville.

On July 22, 1863, Confederate Colonel S. G. Kittchens again reported that the enemy (Union) had appeared in force in the neighborhood of Scatterville.

On January 6, 1864, Union Colonel J. B. Rogers, reported that "Williams Guerillas" were operating near Scatterville.

On May 21, 1864, Captain H. J. Huiskamp of the Sixth Missouri Cavalry, (Union) reported, "On our return, and while in camp near Scatterville, Ark., Captain Johns was shot by guerrillas, a ball passing through and shattering his left arm. He was also wounded in the hip." .

On March 5, 1864, Union Captain T. W. Leeper reported that Confederate Col S. G. Kitchens was at Scatterville and "has returned from General Price and ordered all these scattered bands to report to him, and that they have gone."

In June 1864, Union Brigadier General Ewing reported that Confederate Col Kitchens was at Scatterville with 300 men and that he was still recruiting.

Union Col. John T. Burris reported a skirmish at Scatterville on July 7, 1864, with Bolin's Band and Kitchen's men. Burris reported the casualties as 4 Confederate dead and 1 Union wounded.

Union Col John T Burris, of the 10th Kansas Volunteer Cavalry reported that a skirmish occurred at Scatterville which resulted in the burning of houses in Scatterville. Burris had under his command a battalion of the Second Cavalry, Missouri Militia, a detachment of the 1st Missouri Volunteer Cavalry and a detachment of the First Cavalry Missouri Volunteers. Burris indicates that his command reached Scatterville on July 28, 1864, and

There we routed a rebel recruiting party, under Colonel Clark, and had a skirmish with Bolins guerrillas. We killed 1 rebel lieutenant, took Captain Lineback prisoner, captured some arms and horses, and burned the houses, under cover of which the guerrillas had fired on my command. No casualties on our side, except the wounding of E. T. Jenkins, chief scout

== Bibliography ==
- Dalton, O. L.; "Old Scatterville Cemetery Has Been Adopted." Clay County Democrat, August 8, 1963.
- Dalton, O. L.; "Scatterville Cemetery Gravestones." Clay County Democrat, August 15, 1963.
- Webb, Robert T.; History & Traditions of Clay County. Little Rock, Arkansas: Parke-Harper Co., 1933 (reprinted in the Piggott Times, April 29, 1982.).
