= Eastern Star Lodge 207 F&AM =

- U.S. National Register of Historic Places
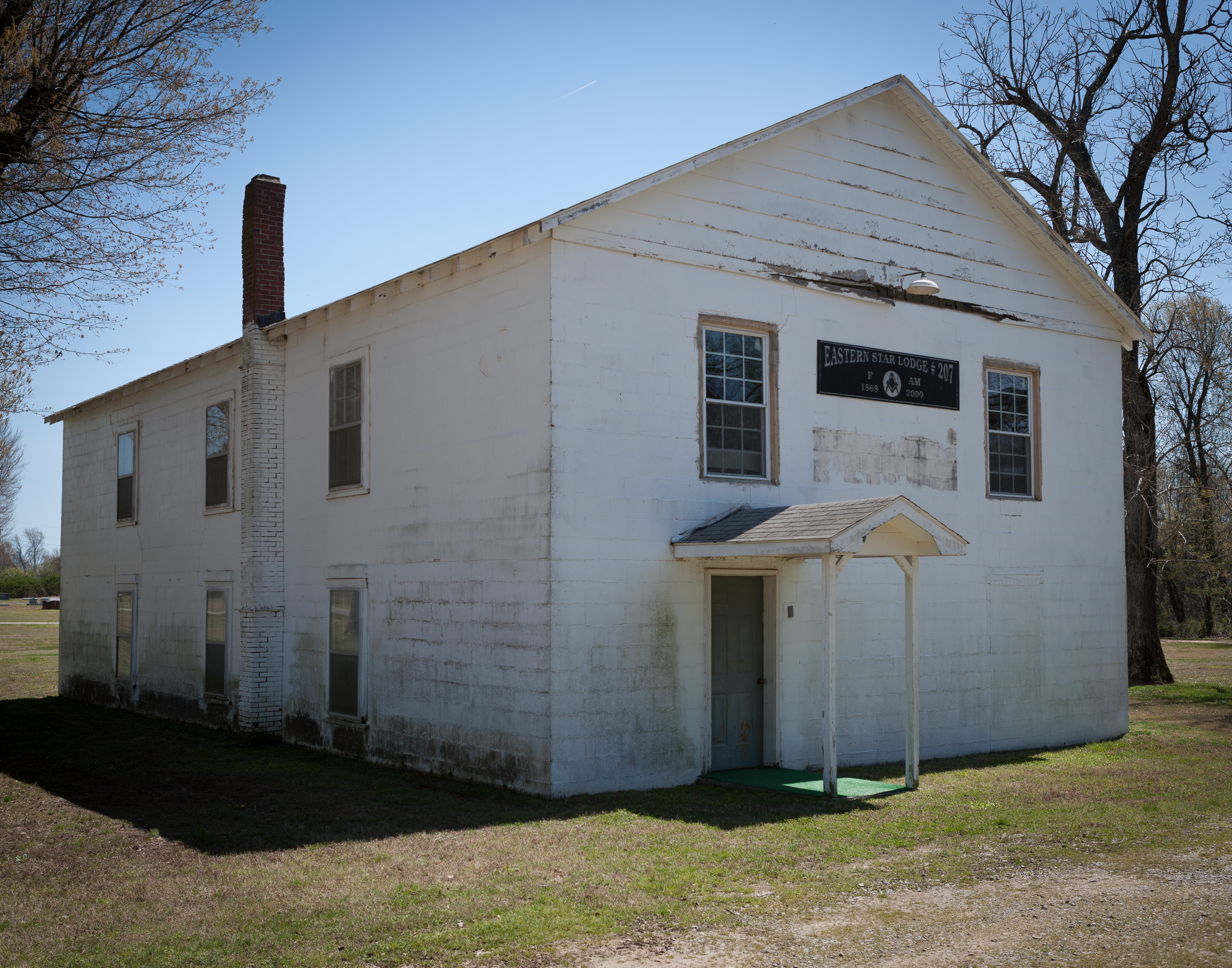

- Location within Arkansas Location within the United States
- Nearest city: St. Francis, Arkansas
- Coordinates: 36°27′5″N 90°10′31″W
- Area: 1 acre (0.40 ha)
- Built: 1947
- Architectural style: Plain-Traditional
- NRHP reference No.: 02001074
- Added to NRHP: October 4, 2002

The Eastern Star Lodge 207 F&AM is a historic Masonic meeting hall outside St. Francis, Arkansas. It is a two-story Plain-Traditional concrete block structure, located on County Road 336 about 1.5 miles (2.4 km) west of town. It was built in 1947 to serve as the first purpose-built home of the local Masonic lodge. Its interior decorations include elements removed from the previous lodge, a repurposed Presbyterian church. The building has long been a significant area social center, hosting public and private functions.

The building was listed on the National Register of Historic Places in 2002.

== See also ==
- National Register of Historic Places listings in Clay County, Arkansas
- List of Masonic buildings in the United States
