= Clay County Courthouse, Eastern District =

- U.S. National Register of Historic Places
- U.S. Historic district – Contributing property
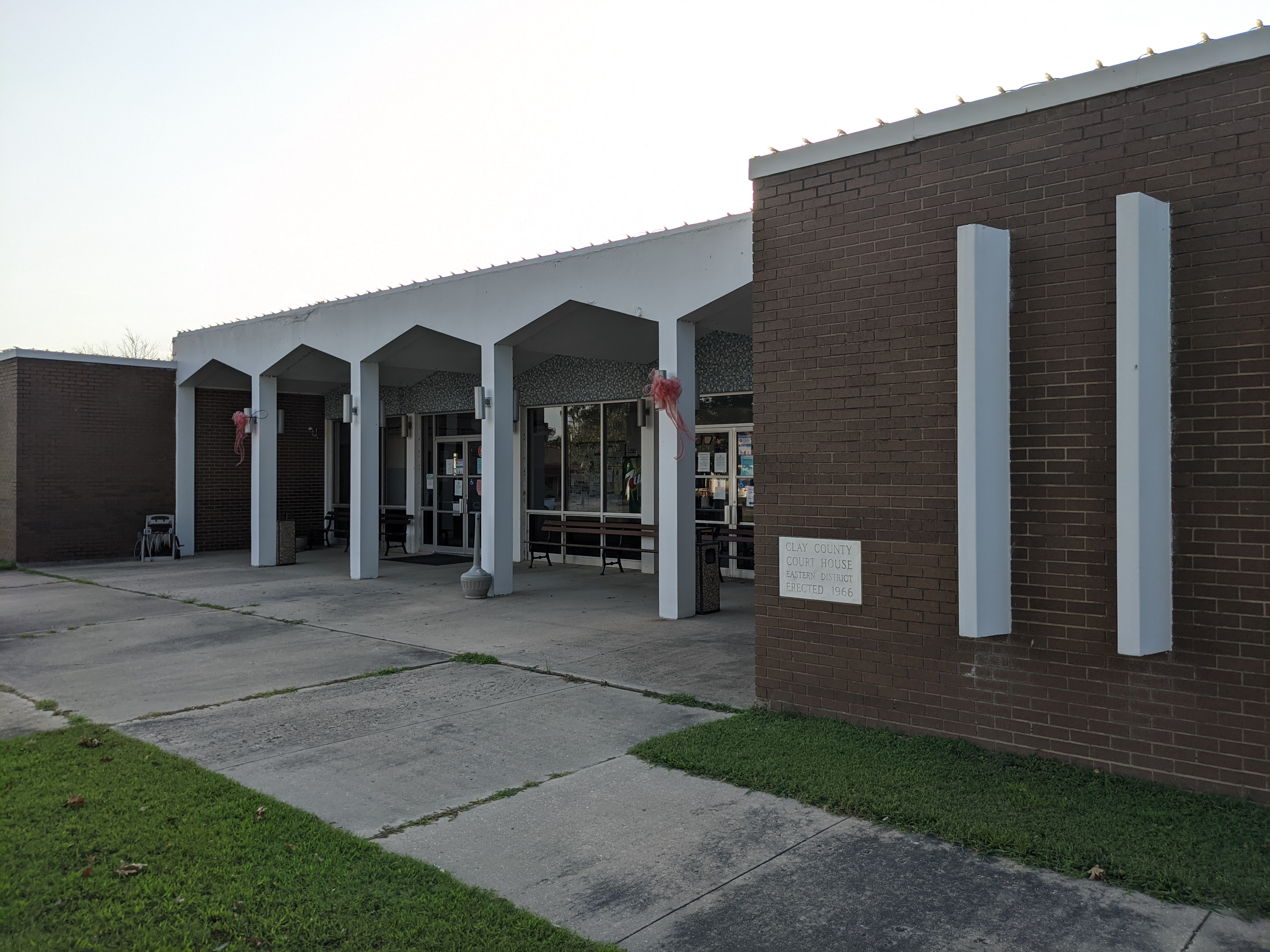

- Location within Arkansas Location within the United States
- Location: 151 S 2nd Ave., Piggott, Arkansas
- Coordinates: 36°22′56″N 90°11′32″W
- Area: 2.4 acres (0.97 ha)
- Built: 1967
- Architect: Donnellan & Porterfield
- Architectural style: New Formalism
- Part of: Piggott Commercial Historic District (ID09000867)
- NRHP reference No.: 100002945

Significant dates
- Added to NRHP: September 19, 2018
- Designated CP: November 4, 2009

The Clay County Courthouse, Eastern District is located at Courthouse Square in the center of Piggott, one of two county seats of Clay County, Arkansas (the other is Corning). It is a single-story masonry structure, built out of concrete with brick facing. The main facade is symmetrical, with a recessed entrance area sheltered by a portico with a zigzag roof. The courthouse was built in 1966–67 to a design by Donnellan & Porterfield, replacing an 1890s Romanesque courthouse designed by Charles L. Thompson. Both this courthouse and that in Corning were built in the wake of a fire which destroyed the old Corning courthouse, and both were designed by Donnellan & Porterfield. Both are locally prominent examples of New Formalism style of Modern architecture.

It is a contributing building in the Piggott Commercial Historic District, which was listed on the National Register of Historic Places in 2009. It was listed individually on the National Register in 2018.

== See also ==
- National Register of Historic Places listings in Clay County, Arkansas
