= Clay County Courthouse, Western District =

- U.S. National Register of Historic Places
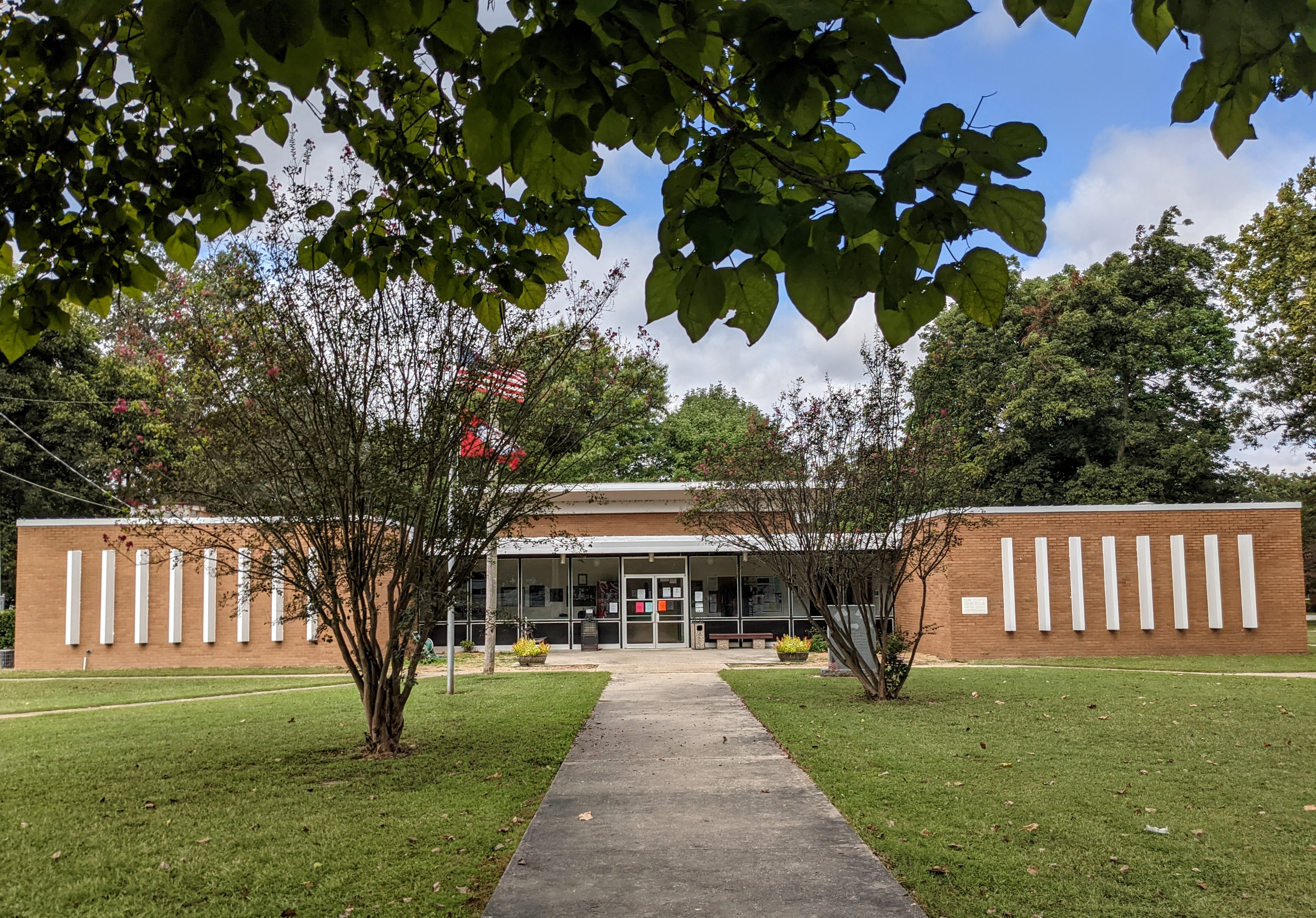
- Clay County Courthouse, Western District

- Location within Arkansas Location within the United States
- Location: 800 W 2nd St., Corning, Arkansas
- Coordinates: 36°24′15″N 90°35′4″W
- Area: 2.4 acres (0.97 ha)
- Built: 1966
- Architect: Donnellan & Porterfield
- Architectural style: New Formalism
- NRHP reference No.: 100002946
- Added to NRHP: September 18, 2018

The Clay County Courthouse, Western District is located at Courthouse Square in the center of Corning, one of two county seats of Clay County, Arkansas (the other is Piggott). It is a single-story masonry structure, built out of concrete with brick facing. The main facade is symmetrical, with a recessed entrance area sheltered by a portico with a flat roof. The courthouse was built in 1966–67 to a design by Donnellan & Porterfield. Both this courthouse and that in Piggott were built in the wake of a fire that destroyed the old Corning courthouse, and both were designed by Donnellan & Porterfield. Both are locally prominent examples of New Formalism style of Modern architecture.

The building was listed in the National Register of Historic Places in 2018.

== See also ==
- National Register of Historic Places listings in Clay County, Arkansas
