= Rector Waterworks Building =

- U.S. National Register of Historic Places
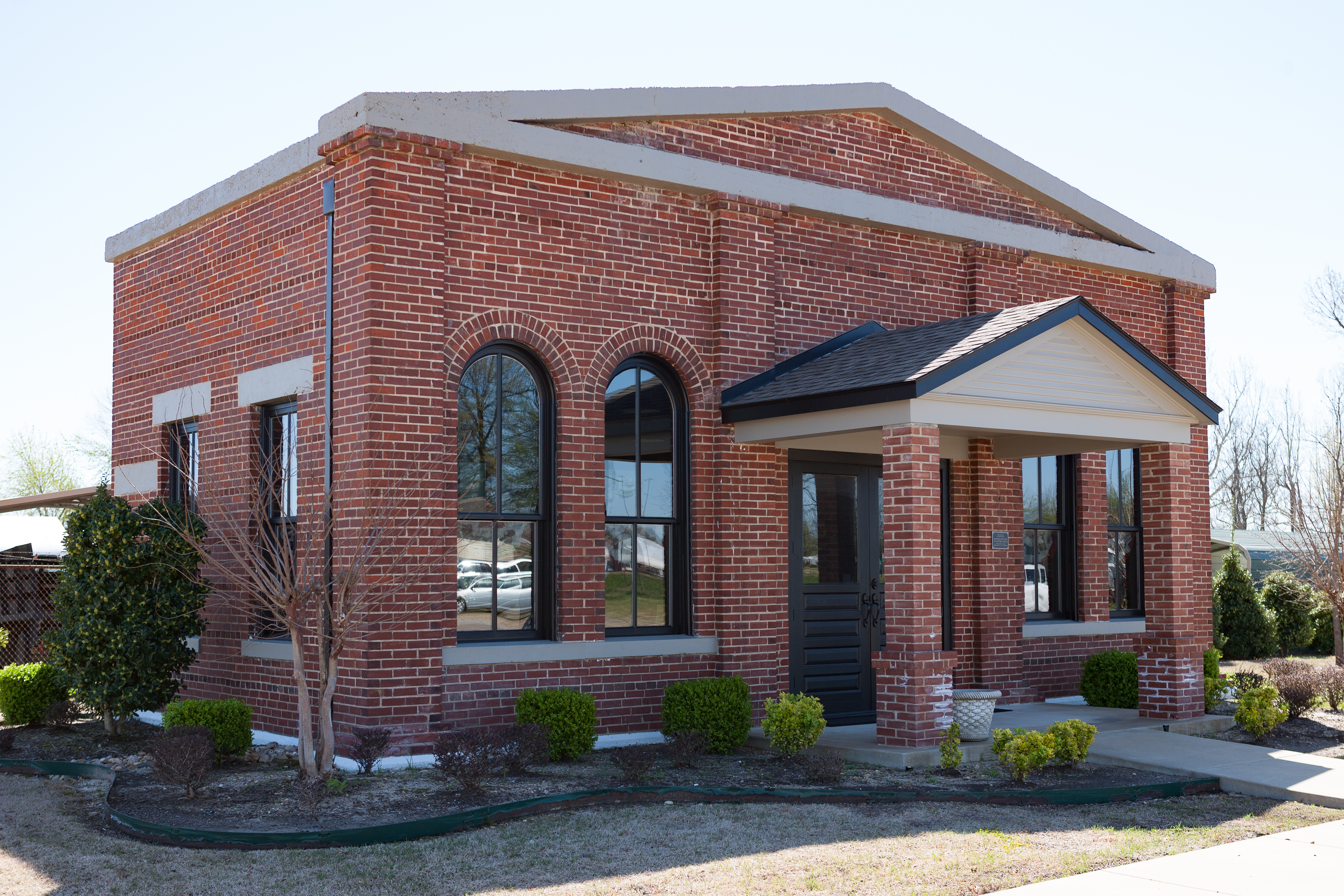

- Location within Arkansas Location within the United States
- Location: 703 S. Main St., Rector, Arkansas
- Coordinates: 36°15′44″N 90°17′33″W
- Area: less than one acre
- Built: 1915
- Architectural style: Classical Revival
- NRHP reference No.: 09000312
- Added to NRHP: May 12, 2009

The Rector Waterworks Building is a historic civic building at 703 South Main Street in Rector, Arkansas. It is a single-story brick building, with a false gabled front masking a flat roof. The front facade is three bays wide, with the outer bays filled with pairs of round-arch windows. The center bay has a slightly recessed double-door entry, with a sheltering gable-roofed portico which is supported by brick piers. The bays are separated by brick pilasters. The building was erected c. 1928 as part of the city's first water supply system. For a period of about 15 years the building also served as the local jail.

The building was listed on the National Register of Historic Places in 2009.

== See also ==
- National Register of Historic Places listings in Clay County, Arkansas
