= Nimmons =

Nimmons can refer to:

- George Nimmons (1865–1947), American architect
- Phil Nimmons (1923–2024), Canadian jazz musician
- Steve Nimmons (born 1970), British technologist
- Nimmons, Arkansas
