= Rector Commercial Historic District =

Historic district in Arkansas, United States

- U.S. National Register of Historic Places
- U.S. Historic district
- Location within Arkansas Location within the United States
- Location: Bounded by St. Louis and Southwestern Railroad tracks on the E. and S., S. Dodd on the W., 3rd St. on the N., Rector, Arkansas
- Coordinates: 36.26368°N 90.29278°W
- Area: 11.4 acres (4.6 ha)
- Built: 1915
- Architectural style: Classical Revival, Early Commercial
- NRHP reference No.: 09000369
- Added to NRHP: June 1, 2009

The Rector Commercial Historic District encompasses the original 1882 central business district of Rector, Arkansas. It includes a roughly triangular area of the city, bounded on the west by Main Street, the north by 3rd Street, and the southeast by the railroad tracks. Most of the district was developed before 1920, and includes a significant concentration of buildings with iron components in their storefronts provided by the noted St. Louis, Missouri firm, the Mesker Brothers, and other similar producers of such architectural elements. The district's buildings are otherwise predominantly brick.

The district was listed on the National Register of Historic Places in 2009.

== See also ==
- National Register of Historic Places listings in Clay County, Arkansas
