= Esso Station (Piggott) =

- Formerly listed on the U.S. National Register of Historic Places
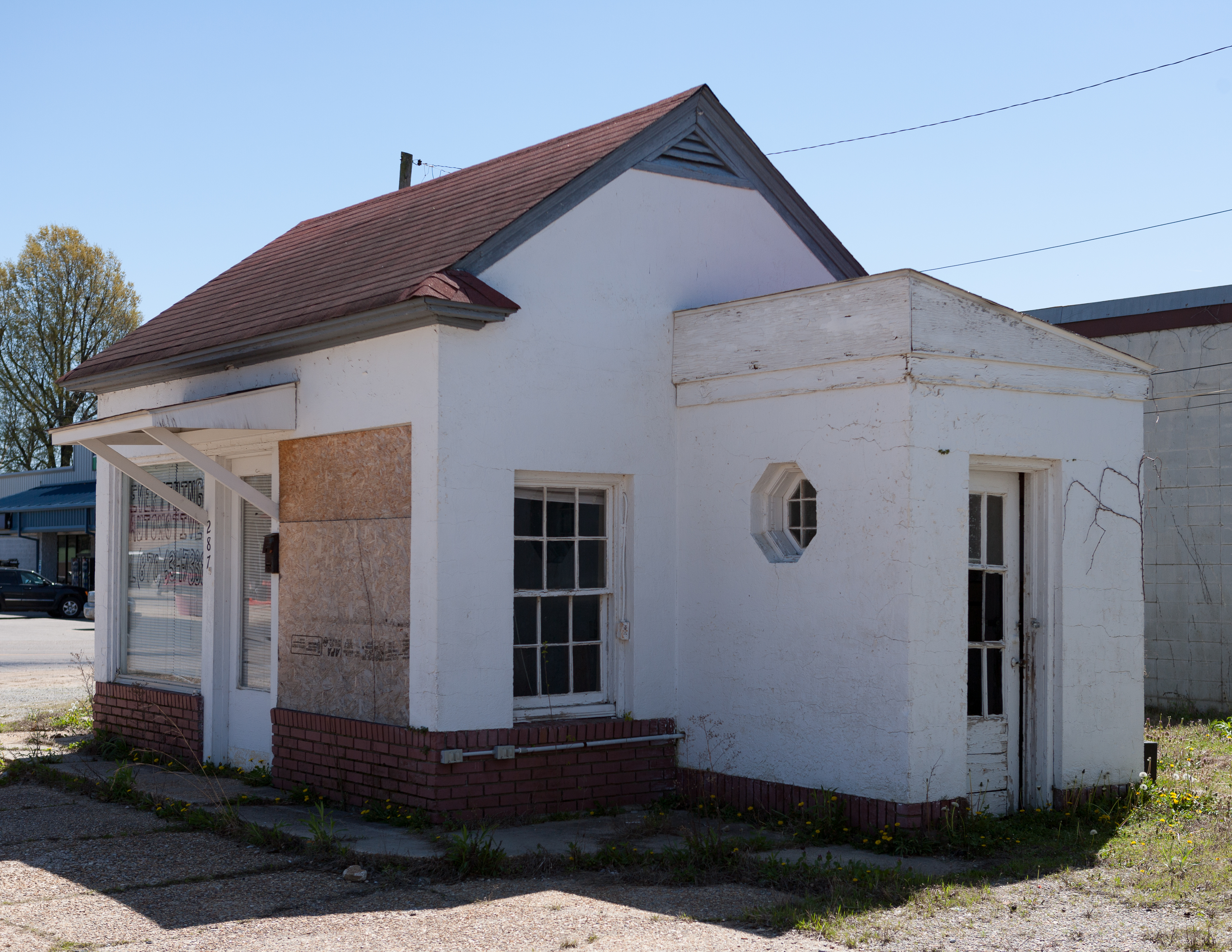
- The Esso Station in April 2016

- Location within Arkansas Location within the United States
- Location: 287 E. Main, Piggott, Arkansas
- Coordinates: 36°22′34″N 90°11′16″W
- Area: less than one acre
- Built: 1942
- Architectural style: Colonial Revival
- MPS: Arkansas Highway History and Architecture MPS
- NRHP reference No.: 00000604

Significant dates
- Added to NRHP: June 2, 2000
- Removed from NRHP: January 2, 2024

The Esso Station was a historic Esso automotive service station at 287 East Main Street in Piggott, Arkansas. It was a small single-story single-room stuccoed structure, with flanking shed-roofed restroom wings on either side. The main block was fronted by plate glass windows on either side of an entrance sheltered by a small shed-roof portico. It had distinctive Colonial Revival detailing, including a row of soldier bricks at the top of the foundation, and a modillioned cornice. The station was built in 1942. It was demolished sometime after August 2013.

The building was listed on the National Register of Historic Places in 2000, at which time the property housed a funeral monuments business. It was delisted in 2024.

== See also ==
- Piggott Commercial Historic District, just outside which the station stands
- National Register of Historic Places listings in Clay County, Arkansas
