= Rector High School =

Location
- 604 west 5th street Rector, Arkansas 72454; United States; 36°15′51″N 90°17′26″W

Information
- Type: Public high school
- School district: Rector School District
- CEEB code: 042145
- NCES School ID: 050437001274
- Principal: Nate Henderson
- Teaching staff: 22.90 (on an FTE basis)
- Grades: 7–12
- Enrollment: 268 (2016-2017)
- Student to teacher ratio: 11.70
- Campus type: Rural
- Colors: Blue and gray
- Athletics conference: 2A Region 3
- Mascot: Cougar
- Team name: Rector Cougars
- Accreditation: AdvancED
- Affiliation: Arkansas Activities Association
- Website: www.rector.k12.ar.us/contact-information-2

Rector High School is a public high school in Rector, Arkansas, United States. It is one of three public high schools located in Clay County and serves the communities of Rector, Piggott, Greenway, Lafe, and Corning. It is the sole high school of the Rector School District.

== Academics ==
The school is accredited by the Arkansas Department of Education (ADE) and has been accredited by AdvancED since 1958. The assumed course of study follows the Smart Core curriculum developed the Arkansas Department of Education (ADE), which requires students to complete at least 24 credit units before graduation. Students engage in regular (core) and career focus courses and exams and may select Advanced Placement (AP) coursework and exams that may lead to college credit.

== Athletics ==
The Rector High School mascot and athletic emblem is the Cougar with the school colors of blue and gray.

The Rector Cougars participate in various interscholastic activities in the 2A Classification within the 2A Region 3 Conference as administered by the Arkansas Activities Association. The Cougars school athletic activities include football, marching band, golf (boys/girls), basketball (boys/girls), baseball, softball, and competitive cheer.

Baseball: Class A State Champions in 1992 and state runners-up in 1979 and 2001.

Basketball: State runners-up in 1959 and 1965. They were also state semifinalists in 1964, 1966, 1977, and 2012.

Marching band: Class A State Champions in 2017.

== Notable alumni ==
- Dale Alford (1932)—Ophthalmologist and politician; U.S. House of Representatives (1959–1963).
