= Battle of Chalk Bluff =

1863 battle of the American Civil War

- Part of the American Civil War
Date	May 1 – 2, 1863
Location	Near Chalk Bluff, northwest of St. Francis (present-day Clay County, Arkansas) 36°28′38.14″N 90°9′31.79″W
Result	Confederate pyrrhic victory

Belligerents
Confederate States	United States

Commanders and leaders
(Confederate States of America) Brig. Gen. J. S. Marmaduke	(United States) Brig. Gen. Wm. Vandever

Units involved
Marmaduke’s Division	Second Division, Army of the Frontier

Strength
2,000	10,000

Casualties and losses
30 killed 60 wounded 120 missing total of 210 men	23 killed 44 wounded 53 captured total of 120 men
- Location within Arkansas

The Battle of Chalk Bluff (May 1 – 2, 1863), also known as the Skirmish at Chalk Bluff, was a military engagement of the American Civil War. The battle was fought near Chalk Bluff, northwest of St. Francis (present-day Clay County, Arkansas), where U.S. Brigadier General William Vandever, commanding the Second Division of the Army of the Frontier, was repulsed in an attempt to prevent Confederate General John S. Marmaduke's Division from crossing the St. Francis River. Though a Confederate victory, Marmaduke suffered considerable casualties and his momentum had been checked, forcing him to abandon his second expedition into Missouri.

== Background ==
Marmaduke departed his camps in Arkansas in the spring of 1863 with 5,000 cavalrymen, bound for southeastern Missouri. In sharp fighting at the Battle of Cape Girardeau, Marmaduke was defeated, and he began a withdrawal on April 27 towards Helena, Arkansas. His line of march was on a road on Crowley's Ridge, a long rise that offered protection for his flanks, as the surrounding terrain was mainly marshy. Union forces under Vandever had pursued Marmaduke through Missouri to Chalk Bluff, Arkansas, where Marmaduke planned to cross the St. Francis River, whose steep chalky white clay banks made fording the river difficult for cavalry.

In an attempt to protect his men while they were crossing the river, Marmaduke set up a rear guard along the ridge that he hoped would protect his engineers and pioneers as they constructed a bridge strong enough to allow the passage of his entire division. He formed an initial defensive line at the hamlet of Four Mile, while posting his reserves in a second line a mile away at Gravel Hill, on the crest of the ridge above the river. They began digging entrenchments to forestall any Union attack.

== Battle ==
Fighting began on May 1 and continued into the next day. Vandever's men were unable to drive the Confederates from the heights. Although Marmaduke's rear guard sustained heavy casualties, it delayed the numerically superior Union forces long enough as to allow for the construction team to finish building the bridge and allow Marmaduke’s main force to cross the river. However, because of the heavy casualties that were suffered by the Confederates, Marmaduke was forced to end the expedition and return to his camp.

Confederate sources including Gen. Marmaduke and a few letters from Confederate enlisted soldiers differ by stating the union forces suffered significant casualties in trying to take the entrenched ridges. Gen. Thompson moved the artillery across the river by raft the first night, so while trying to take the ridges the union forces were suffering cannon fire coming over their right shoulder and continuing down the long line of their formation.

== Aftermath ==
While, in some respects, Marmaduke tactically won the Battle of Chalk Bluff, the Union forces claimed a strategic victory since he had abandoned his spring offensive.

== Battlefield preservation ==
The battle is commemorated today in the small Chalk Bluff Battlefield Park, which preserves a portion of the field and has been listed on the National Register of Historic Places. The Chalk Bluff Hiking Trail traverses parts of the battlefield, with interpretive wayside markers and panels. A few minor skirmishes occurred there later in the war as both armies sent raiding parties to control the river crossing.

The towns of Chalk Bluff, Four Mile and Gravel Hill are no longer extant.

== See also ==
- Arkansas in the American Civil War
- List of American Civil War battles
- Missouri in the American Civil War
- Trans-Mississippi Theater of the American Civil War
- Troop engagements of the American Civil War, 1863
