= Rector School District =

School district in Arkansas

- Administration Building

Location
- 604 West 5th Street; Rector, Arkansas 72461 United States

District information
- Grades: PK–12
- Accreditation: Arkansas Department of Education
- Schools: 2
- NCES District ID: 0504370

Students and staff
- Students: 627
- Teachers: 54.58 (on FTE basis)
- Staff: 105.58 (on FTE basis)
- Student–teacher ratio: 11.49
- Athletic conference: 2A Region 3
- District mascot: Cougar
- Colors: Blue; Gray

Other information
- Website: rector.k12.ar.us

Rector School District is a public school district based in Rector, Arkansas, United States. The school district encompasses 179.00 square miles (463.6 km^{2}) of land, including portions of Clay County and Greene County serving the communities of Rector and Greenway.

The Rector School District was previously known as the Clay County Central School District from its founding in 1984 until 2000.

The district proves comprehensive education for more than 600 pre-kindergarten through grade 12 students and is accredited by the Arkansas Department of Education (ADE).

== History ==
It was established by the merger of the Greenway School District and the former Rector School District on July 1, 1984.

== Schools ==
- Rector High School, located in Rector and serving more than 250 students in grades 7 through 12.
- Rector Elementary School, located in Rector and serving more than 350 students in pre-kindergarten through grade 6.
