= Pollard, Arkansas =

- City
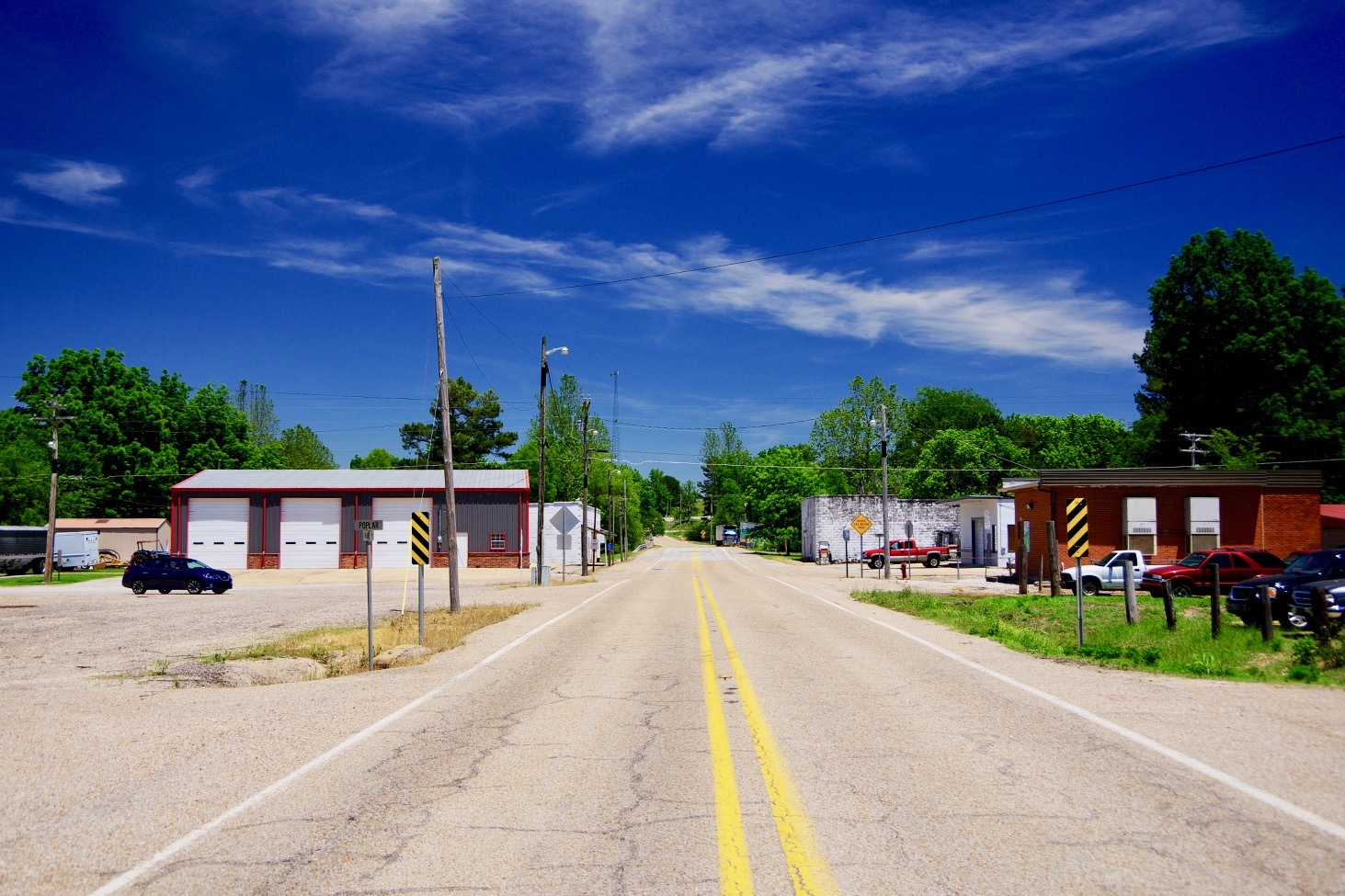
- Main Street (US-62)

- Location of Pollard in Clay County, Arkansas.
- Coordinates: 36°25′46″N 90°16′02″W
- Country: United States
- State: Arkansas
- County: Clay
- Established: October 15, 1921

Area
  - Total: 0.30 sq mi (0.77 km^{2})
  - Land: 0.30 sq mi (0.77 km^{2})
  - Water: 0 sq mi (0.00 km^{2})
- Elevation: 338 ft (103 m)

Population (2020)
  - Total: 193
  - Estimate (2025): 186 ▼
  - Density: 650.6/sq mi (251.18/km^{2})
- Time zone: UTC-6 (Central (CST))
  - Summer (DST): UTC-5 (CDT)
- ZIP code: 72456
- Area code: 870
- FIPS code: 05-56600
- GNIS feature ID: 2404546

Pollard is a city in Clay County, Arkansas, United States. As of the 2020 census, Pollard had a population of 193.

== History ==
Pollard is named for a family of early settlers who operated a general store that became home to the town's post office in 1876. The post office briefly moved to the nearby Tucker plantation and became known as "Advance," but was eventually restored to Pollard. A railroad line was constructed through Pollard in 1914 to serve area timber operations, and a town was platted around the newly constructed depot. Pollard incorporated in 1921.

== Geography ==
Pollard is located at 36°25′50″N 90°16′8″W (36.430686, -90.268820). The town is located at the intersection of U.S. Route 62 and Arkansas Highway 139, northwest of Piggott, and a few miles south of the Arkansas-Missouri state line.

According to the United States Census Bureau, the town has a total area of 0.8 km^{2} (0.3 mi^{2}), all land.

== Demographics ==
Historical population
Census	Pop.	Note	%±
1930	173		—
1940	169		−2.3%
1950	165		−2.4%
1960	170		3.0%
1970	253		48.8%
1980	298		17.8%
1990	229		−23.2%
2000	240		4.8%
2010	222		−7.5%
2020	193		−13.1%
2025 (est.)	186	▼	−3.6%
U.S. Decennial Census

As of the census of 2000, there were 240 people, 96 households, and 72 families residing in the town. The population density was 319.5/km^{2} (819.0/mi^{2}). There were 105 housing units at an average density of 139.8/km^{2} (358.3/mi^{2}). The racial makeup of the town was 100.00% White. 1.25% of the population were Hispanic or Latino of any race.

There were 96 households, out of which 30.2% had children under the age of 18 living with them, 60.4% were married couples living together, 13.5% had a female householder with no husband present, and 24.0% were non-families. 20.8% of all households were made up of individuals, and 12.5% had someone living alone who was 65 years of age or older. The average household size was 2.50 and the average family size was 2.88.

In the town, the population was spread out, with 28.3% under the age of 18, 10.4% from 18 to 24, 24.2% from 25 to 44, 20.4% from 45 to 64, and 16.7% who were 65 years of age or older. The median age was 33 years. For every 100 females, there were 83.2 males. For every 100 females age 18 and over, there were 89.0 males.

The median income for a household in the town was $19,375, and the median income for a family was $23,750. Males had a median income of $21,136 versus $13,750 for females. The per capita income for the town was $10,220. About 14.3% of families and 16.0% of the population were below the poverty line, including 8.3% of those under the age of eighteen and 32.5% of those 65 or over.

== Pollard Picnic ==
The Pollard Picnic is held annually on the second Saturday in July. The picnic includes various events, such as beauty contests, gospel and country singing, Bingo, a ring toss, a men's softball tournament, swings for children, a bubble gum blowing contest, and awards for oldest male, female, and visitor traveling furthest. A benefit auction is also held during the day in which items donated from various businesses and individuals in the community are bid upon. Cash prizes and a handmade quilt made by ladies in the community are raffled at the end of the day's events. All proceeds from the Pollard Picnic go toward the upkeep of the New Hope Cemetery.

== Education ==
It is in the Piggott School District.
