= Chalk Bluff, Arkansas =

- Chalk Bluff
- U.S. National Register of Historic Places
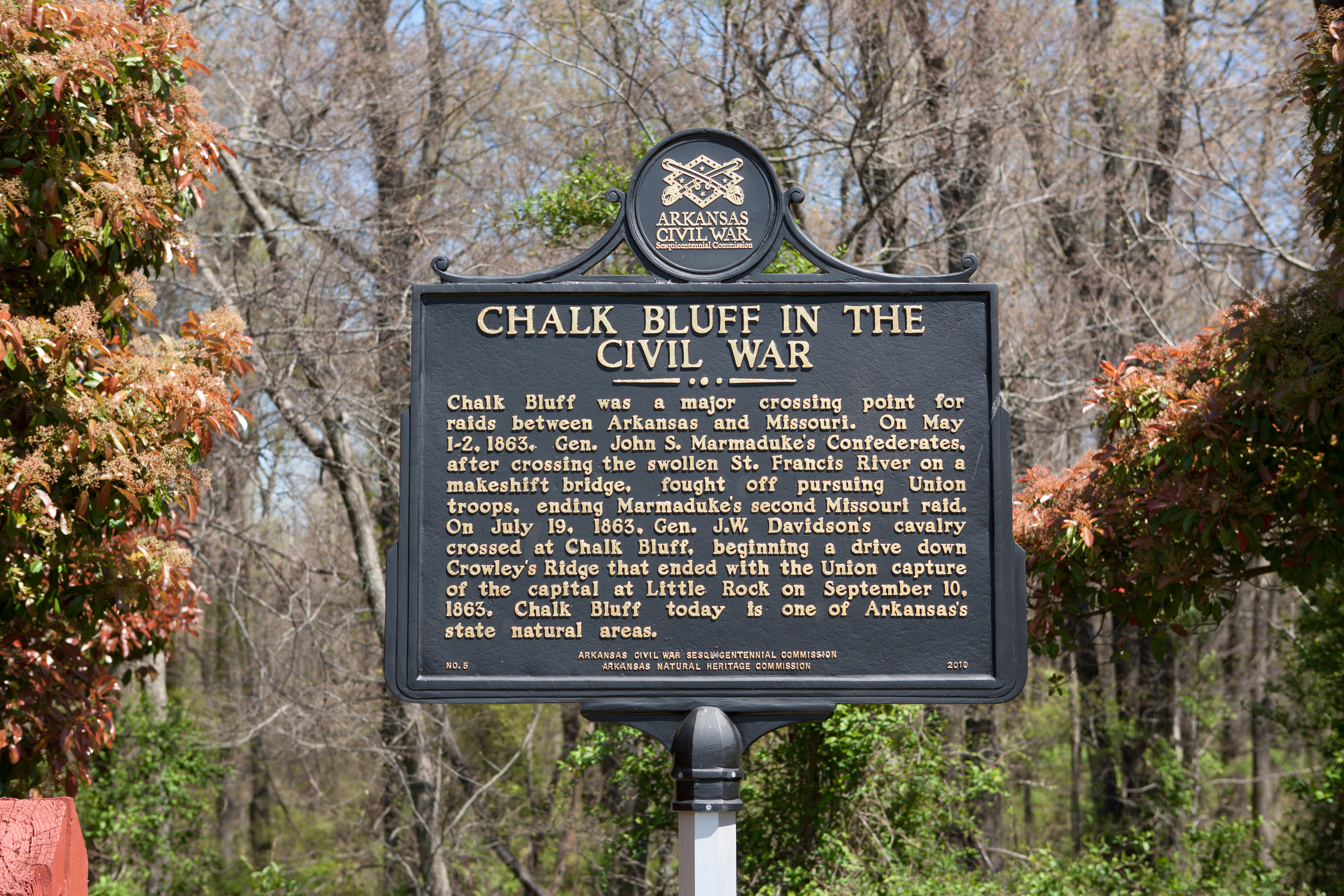

- Location within Arkansas Location within the United States
- Nearest city: St. Francis, Arkansas
- Coordinates: 36°28′41″N 90°9′32″W
- Area: 9.5 acres (3.8 ha)
- Built: 1840
- NRHP reference No.: 74000470
- Added to NRHP: October 29, 1974

Chalk Bluff was an unincorporated community in Clay County, Arkansas, United States, approximately two miles (3 km) northwest of St. Francis. The town was formed in the 1820s at the point where the St. Francis River cuts through Crowley's Ridge from west to east. The name of the community was derived from the white clay bluff created by this crossing. The founder of the community was Abraham Seitz, who established and operated a ferry crossing and general store in the area from the 1830 until it was destroyed during the Civil War. The community occupied a strategic location and was often referred to in the reports of Union and Confederate forces vying for control of Northeast Arkansas during the war. Several skirmishes occurred near the ferry crossing, one of which was significant it enough to become known as the Battle of Chalk Bluff, which took place in early May 1863. The town was abandoned following the Civil War and most residents moved to the new railroad town, St. Francis, Arkansas. The location was listed on the National Register of Historic Places in 1974.

The site is now home to the Chalk Bluff Battlefield Park which commemorates the May 1863 battle and to the Chalk Bluff Natural Area.

== See also ==
- National Register of Historic Places listings in Clay County, Arkansas
