= Redneck Performing Arts Association =

The Redneck Performing Arts Association, or RPAA for short, is a group of Clemson, South Carolina patrons of the ESSO Club, who sponsored a three-day music festival beginning in 1981 to raise money for charity.

Spittoono featured local bands who performed for free for the exposure. No admission was charged to the family-friendly event, held since 1991 at the Clemson National Guard Armory in Pendleton, South Carolina. Charity dollars were raised through the sale of annual tee-shirts, and of cold beverages. As of 1982, the RPAA was chartered as a 501(c)(3) charity organization. From 1981 to 1990, the event was held in the parking lot of the ESSO Club, but it eventually outgrew the available space there. The name is a tongue-in-cheek reference to the Spoleto cultural arts festival held each year in Charleston, South Carolina. The event ended in 2017.
