= Piggott Commercial Historic District =

Historic district in Arkansas, United States

- U.S. National Register of Historic Places
- U.S. Historic district
- Location within Arkansas Location within the United States
- Interactive map of Piggott Commercial Historic District
- Location: Roughly bounded on the N. by W. Cherry on the South by W. Court, on the E. by S. Throgmorton and the W. by Clay, Piggott, Arkansas
- Area: 20 acres (8.1 ha)
- Built: 1937
- Architect: Porterfield, E.E.; Porterfield, H.R.
- Architectural style: Classical Revival, Early Commercial
- NRHP reference No.: 09000867
- Added to NRHP: November 4, 2009

The Piggott Commercial Historic District encompasses the original center of the city of Piggott, Arkansas, as originally platted out in 1887. It is centered on the square where the Clay County courthouse is located, buildings facing the courthouse square, and also buildings along some of the adjacent streets. In addition to the courthouse (separately listed on the National Register in 2018), the district includes the c. 1910 railroad depot, city hall, two churches, the 1930s Post Office building, a cotton gin, and a grain storage yard. The town grew because of the railroad, and the plentiful timber in the area, whose harvesting fueled the early economy in the region. The oldest building in the district is the 1897 Clay County Bank at 188 West Main Street.

The district was listed on the National Register of Historic Places in 2009.

== See also ==
- National Register of Historic Places listings in Clay County, Arkansas
