= Spittoono =

Music festival in Central, South Carolina

Coordinates: 34.6741°N 82.8137°W

Spittoono is an annual family-friendly three-day music festival held in August in Central, South Carolina, in a field off of Road 18 on the south side of US 123, the purpose of which is to raise monies for charity. Begun as a tongue-in-cheek spoof of Spoleto, the cultural festival for performing arts in Charleston, South Carolina, Spittoono (or Spitoono, as it was spelled in alternating years) was founded by the Redneck Performing Arts Association (RPAA) a loosely organized group of locals at the ESSO Club, a gas station and grocery turned bar located on the Old Greenville Highway in Clemson. The ESSO Club has Clemson's longest-established beer license dating to December 1933. RPAA was chartered as a 501(c)(3) charity in 1982.

Begun in the summer of 1981, this annual event has raised well over $130,000 benefitting a variety of regional charities benefiting "kids and animals." Local bands play for free and no admission is charged to the grounds where the event takes place, the money coming from the sale of tee-shirts and of cold beverages. Musical styles presented run from rock and roll, and country to Bluegrass and the Blues. More Opry than opera... Spittoono was held in the parking lot of the ESSO Club from 1981 to 1990 by which time it had outgrown the available space. This fact, and a disagreement with the then-owner of the watering hole over the beer sales accounting, led to the music fest moving to the more accommodating space at the Guard Armory in 1991. Spittoono moved to its current location in 2015 after outgrowing the armory field.

Due to declining patronage from both the more remote site, as well as the aging of a core group of attendees (plus bad luck with Mother Nature for two successive years), the RPAA is billing Spittoono XXXVII, held August 24-26, 2017, as the Grand Finale. On the final night of Spittoono XXXVII, it was announced from the stage that a new sponsor has agreed to assume the project, so Spittoono lives.

The RPAA announced on September 8, 2017, that $18,000 was being donated to a dozen charities, raised during the year's event.
