= Scatterville Cemetery =

Historic cemetery in Arkansas, United States

- U.S. National Register of Historic Places
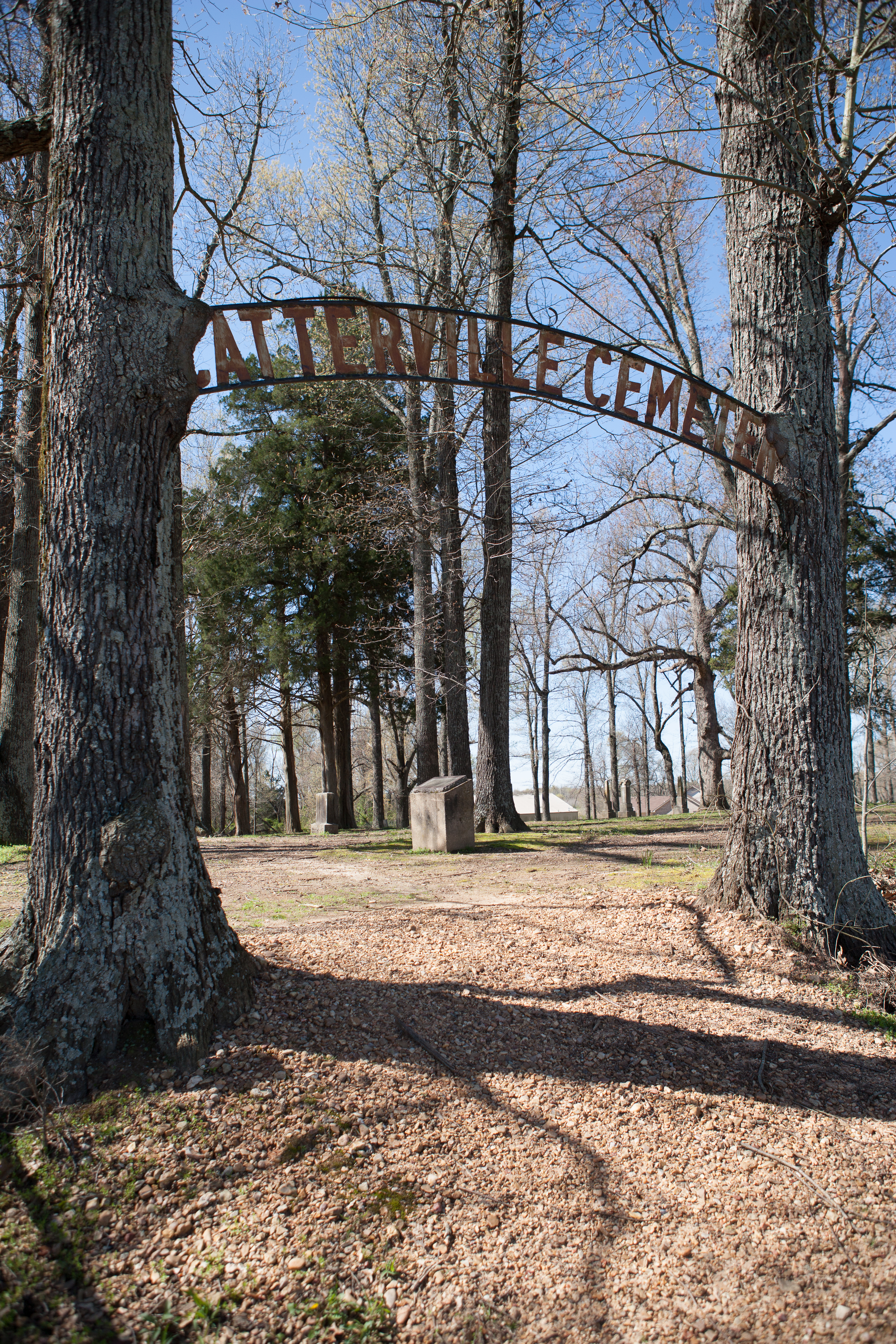

- Location within Arkansas Location within the United States
- Nearest city: Rector, Arkansas
- Coordinates: 36.28209°N 90.31307°W
- Area: 2 acres (0.81 ha)
- NRHP reference No.: 95000364
- Added to NRHP: March 31, 1995

The Scatterville Cemetery is a historic cemetery in rural Clay County, Arkansas. It covers 2 acres (0.81 hectares) and is situated approximately 2 miles (3.2 km) northwest of Rector. The cemetery contains thirty marked graves, though records suggest there may be at least 52. The earliest burial dates back to 1857, with most burials occurring in the 1870s. The cemetery is the only remaining part of the Scatterville community, an antebellum community bypassed by the railroad, whose inhabitants likely relocated to Rector.

The cemetery was listed on the National Register of Historic Places in 1995.

== See also ==
- National Register of Historic Places listings in Clay County, Arkansas
