= Sheeks House =

Historic house in Arkansas, United States

- U.S. National Register of Historic Places
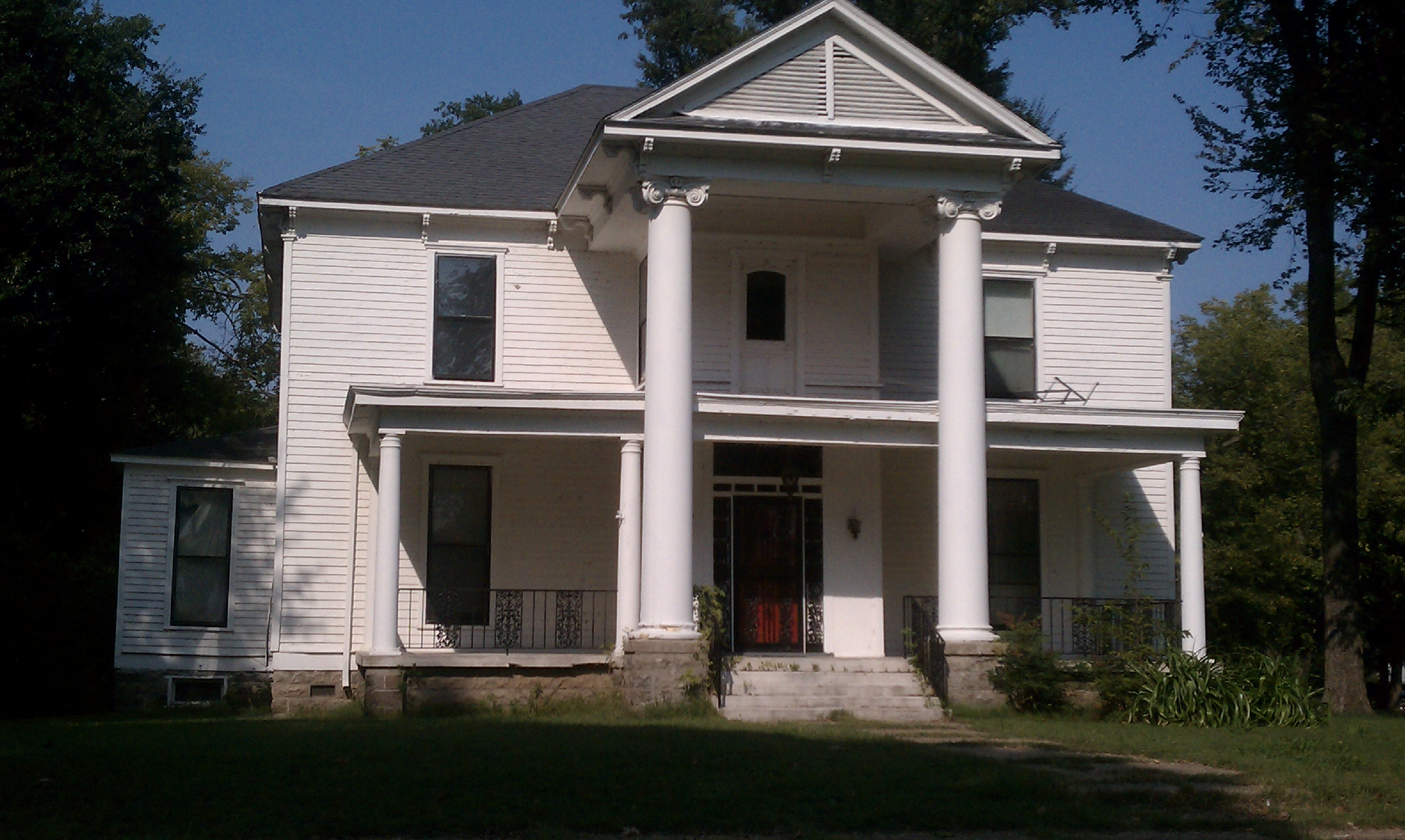

- Location within Arkansas Location within the United States
- Location: 502 Market St., Corning, Arkansas
- Coordinates: 36°24′18″N 90°35′2″W
- Area: less than one acre
- Built: 1872
- NRHP reference No.: 75000376
- Added to NRHP: August 22, 1975

The Sheeks House is a historic house at 502 Market Street in Corning, Arkansas. It is a 2 1/2-story wood-frame structure with a hip roof. A slightly projecting center section of its main facade is dominated by two-story gable-roofed portico, supported by a pair of two-story round Ionic columns. Passing under this portico is a single-story porch spanning the facade's three bays. The house was built in 1872 by E. Foster Brown, a prominent regional lawyer, but has been owned for most of the time since by members of the Sheeks family. Brown sold the house in 1878 to Edward V. Sheeks, one of the small community's first significant businessmen. Although of some architectural interest for the early 20th-century alterations that dominate its appearance, it is most significant for its association with these two men, both prominent in the politics and business of the region.

The house was listed on the National Register of Historic Places in 1975.

== See also ==
- National Register of Historic Places listings in Clay County, Arkansas
