= Baynham House =

Historic house in Arkansas, United States

- U.S. National Register of Historic Places
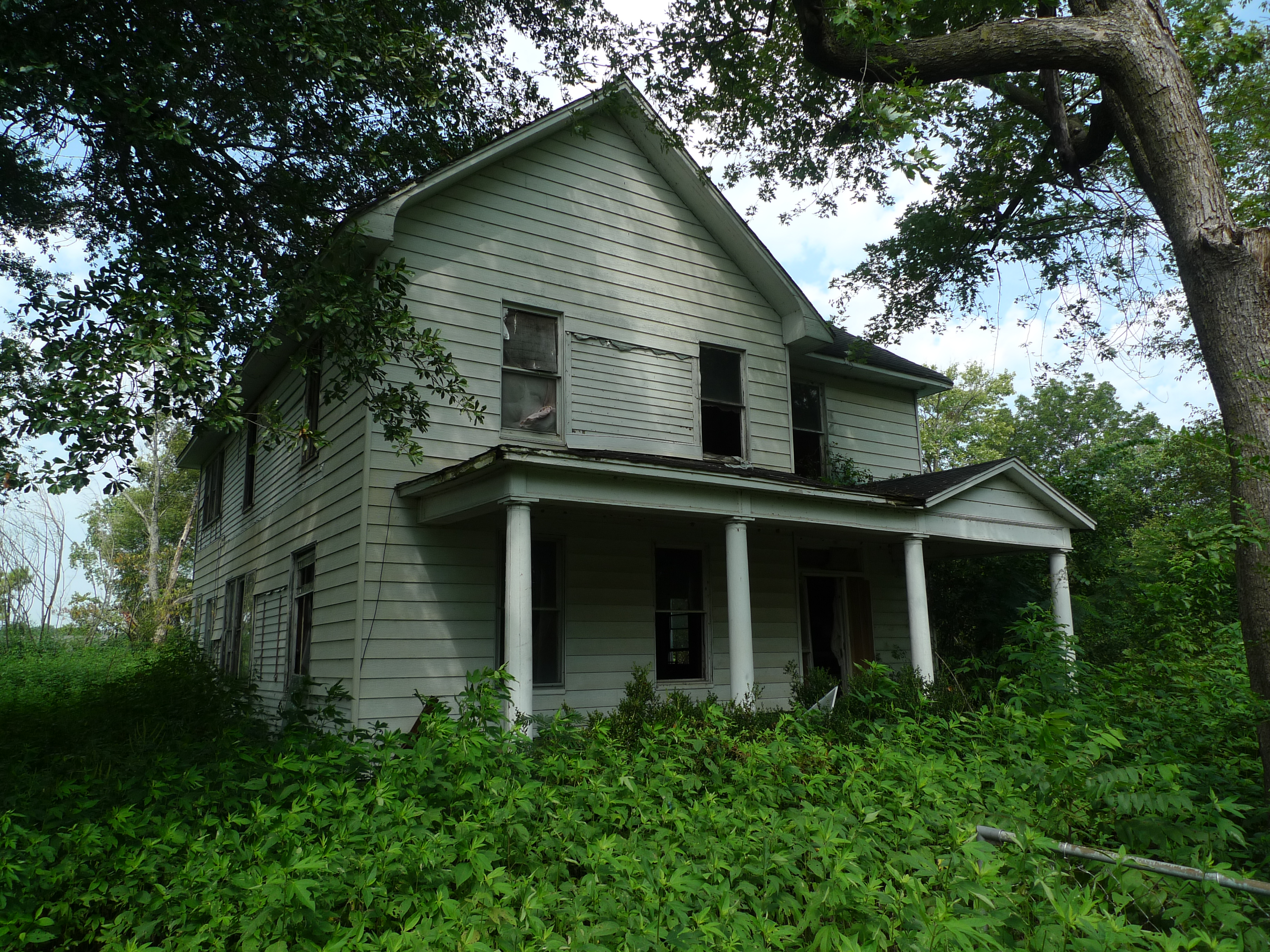

- Location within Arkansas Location within the United States
- Location: Stephens St; Success, Arkansas
- Coordinates: 36°27′5″N 90°43′29″W
- Area: less than one acre
- Built: 1911
- NRHP reference No.: 78000579
- Added to NRHP: August 31, 1978

The Baynham House is a historic house on Stephens Street in Success, Arkansas. It is a two-story wood-frame structure with a hip-and-gable roof, and a porch extending across the width of the front. It was built in 1911 by J. W. Baynham, a local lumber merchant, and is one of the few buildings in the community to survive from its heyday as a lumber town in the early 20th century.

The house was listed on the National Register of Historic Places in 1978.

== See also ==
- National Register of Historic Places listings in Clay County, Arkansas
