= Waddle House =

Historic house in Arkansas, United States

- U.S. National Register of Historic Places
- Location within Arkansas Location within the United States
- Location: S. Erwin, Success, Arkansas
- Coordinates: 36°27′4″N 90°43′21″W
- Area: less than one acre
- Built: 1909
- NRHP reference No.: 77000246
- Added to NRHP: March 28, 1977

The Waddle House is a historic house on South Erwin Street in Success, Arkansas. It is a two-story wood frame L-shaped structure, with a hip roof that has large gable sections. A single-story porch wraps around two sides of the house. It was built in 1909, when the town was at its economic height due to the success lumber industry. It was built by Dr. M. V. B. Waddle, one of the first doctors to serve in the area, and was one of the finest houses in the town at the time of its construction.

The house was listed on the National Register of Historic Places in 1977.

== See also ==
- National Register of Historic Places listings in Clay County, Arkansas
