= Piggott School District =

School district in Arkansas, United States

Location
- 429 East Main Street; Piggott, Arkansas 72454 United States

District information
- Grades: PK–12
- Accreditation: Arkansas Department of Education
- Schools: 2
- NCES District ID: 0511370

Students and staff
- Students: 1,014
- Teachers: 76.33 (on FTE basis)
- Staff: 164.33 (on FTE basis)
- Student–teacher ratio: 13.28
- Athletic conference: 3A Region 3
- District mascot: Mohawks
- Colors: Red; Black

Other information
- Website: www.piggottschools.net

Piggott School District is a public school district based in Piggott, Arkansas, United States. The school district encompasses 146.56 square miles (379.6 km^{2}) of land, including portions of Clay County and serving communities such as Piggott, Pollard, Nimmons, and Saint Francis.

The district proves comprehensive education for more than 1,000 pre-kindergarten through grade 12 students and is accredited by the Arkansas Department of Education (ADE) and AdvancED.

== Schools ==
- Piggott High School, located in Piggott and serving more than 450 students in grades 7 through 12.
- Piggott Elementary School, located in Piggott and serving more than 500 students in pre-kindergarten through grade 6.
