= Sink-Crumb Post No. 72 American Legion Hut =

- U.S. National Register of Historic Places
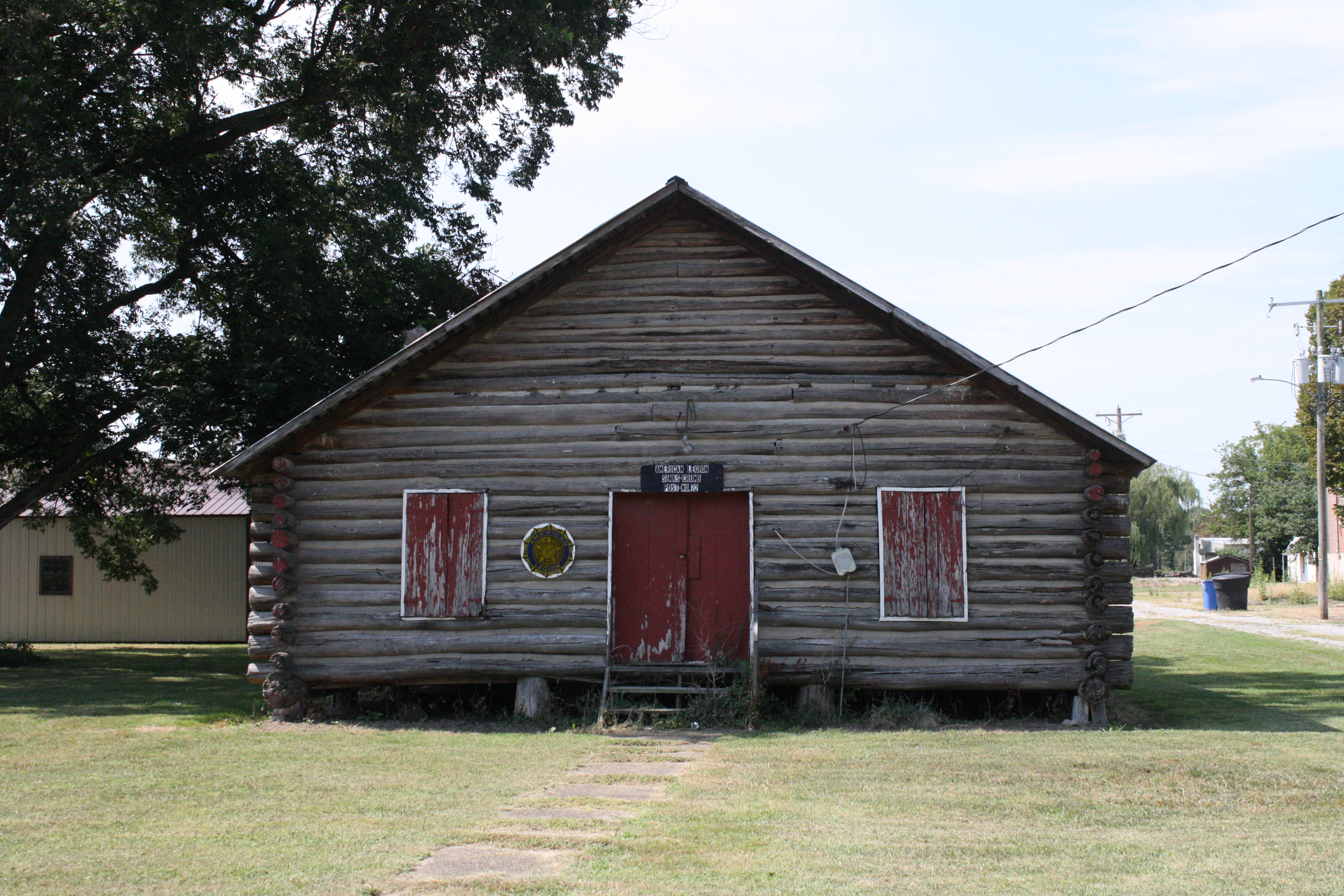

- Location within Arkansas Location within the United States
- Location: NE. corner of 2nd and Cherry Sts., Knobel, Arkansas
- Coordinates: 36°19′19″N 90°36′0″W
- Area: less than one acre
- Built: 1934
- Built by: Civil Works Administration
- Architectural style: Rustic
- NRHP reference No.: 08000934
- Added to NRHP: September 25, 2008

The Sink-Crumb Post No. 72 American Legion Hut is a historic American Legion hall at Second and Cherry Streets in Knobel, Arkansas. It is a single-story cypress log structure, with a corrugated tin roof, a Rustic form that was typical of Legion halls of the 1930s. The hall was built in 1933–34 with funding from the Federal Civil Works Administration for the local American Legion chapter, which had been founded in 1931, and has served as a center for its activities since then.

The building was listed on the National Register of Historic Places in 2008.

== See also ==
- National Register of Historic Places listings in Clay County, Arkansas
