= Skeets McDonald =

American singer-songwriter

Background information
- Also known as: Skeets McDonald; Skeets Saunders
- Born: Enos William McDonald; October 1, 1915
- Origin: Greenway, Arkansas, U.S.
- Died: March 31, 1968 (aged 52) Los Angeles, California
- Genres: country, honky tonk, rockabilly
- Occupation: singer, songwriter
- Instrument: guitar
- Years active: 1935 – 1968
- Labels: Fortune; London; Mercury; Capitol; Columbia Uni Records ("It's Genuine")

Enos William McDonald (October 1, 1915 – March 31, 1968), better known as Skeets McDonald, was an American country and rockabilly musician popular during the 1950s and 60s. Best known for the Slim Willet-penned song "Don't Let the Stars Get in Your Eyes", McDonald was a devoted honky tonk singer and songwriter whose work helped to bridge the gap between country and rock and roll.

== Biography ==
McDonald was born on October 1, 1915, in Greenway, Arkansas. He was the youngest of his parents' seven children; he gained his nickname for calling mosquitoes "skeets" as a child. When his older brother moved to Detroit, Michigan, in the early 1930s, McDonald followed; he joined his first band, the Lonesome Cowboys, in 1935. He later formed his own band and played local clubs and on radio in Flint and Pontiac.

McDonald was drafted in 1943 and was stationed in North Africa and the Far East during World War II, earning a Bronze Star. On discharge, he returned to radio and television work in Dearborn, Michigan. He made his first recordings for Fortune Records in 1950 with Johnnie White and his Rough Riders, and cut records for London and Mercury Records as Skeets Saunders.

In 1951, McDonald moved to Los Angeles, California, where he became a regular on Cliffie Stone's Hometown Jamboree and later appeared on Town Hall Party. He was soon signed by Capitol Records, which viewed him as its answer to Columbia Records' Lefty Frizzell and demanded he continue releasing country songs rather than the rockabilly sound he had experimented with since the war. He recorded more than 80 numbers for the label, including his 1952 smash country hit, "Don't Let the Stars Get in Your Eyes" (No. 1 for 3 weeks on the charts for 18 weeks). In the late 1950s, he appeared on Ozark Jubilee and continued recording for Capitol; his last release for the label was the album The Country's Best.

McDonald signed with Columbia in 1959 and spent the decade there, recording some West Coast hillbilly, as well as some forays into rockabilly. He employed young guitar-whiz Eddie Cochran to back him in the studio for "You Oughta See Grandma Rock" and "Heart Breaking Mama". Although they made little impact on the charts at the time, they are now considered rockabilly classics.

He scored several hits on the Billboard country chart, including "This Old Heart" (1960, No. 21), "Call Me Mr. Brown" (1963, No. 9), "Big Chief Buffalo Nickel (Desert Blues)" (1966, No. 29), and "Mabel" (1967, No. 28). He also appeared on the Grand Ole Opry and the Big D Jamboree in Dallas, Texas. His songs included "I'll Make Believe", "Big Family Trouble", "I Need Your Love" and "The Echo of Your Footsteps". In 1964, he released the album Call Me Skeets!.

McDonald made several film appearances, including Saddle Pals with Johnny Mack Brown, Ma and Pa Kettle Go to Town (1950), The Glenn Miller Story (1954) and Hud (1963), singing "Driftwood on the River" with Janet McBride.

In later years, McDonald moved his style more towards rock and roll; but refused to move far from the tearjerking songs which made his name. When told by reviewers he "belonged to another age," he took it as a compliment to his dedication.

McDonald died from a heart attack on March 31, 1968, in Los Angeles.

== Discography ==
=== Albums ===
Year	Album	Label
1958	Goin' Steady with the Blues	Capitol
1959	The Country's Best	Capitol
1962	Our Best to You	Capitol
1964	Call Me Skeets	Columbia
1967	Skeets	Sears
1969	Tattooed Lady and Other Songs	Fortune

=== Singles ===
Year	Single	US Country
1952	"Don't Let the Stars Get in Your Eyes"	1
1960	"This Old Heart"	21
1963	"Call Me Mr. Brown"	9
1965	"Big Chief Buffalo Nickel (Desert Blues)"	29
1967	"Mabel"	28
