= Greenway, Arkansas =

- City
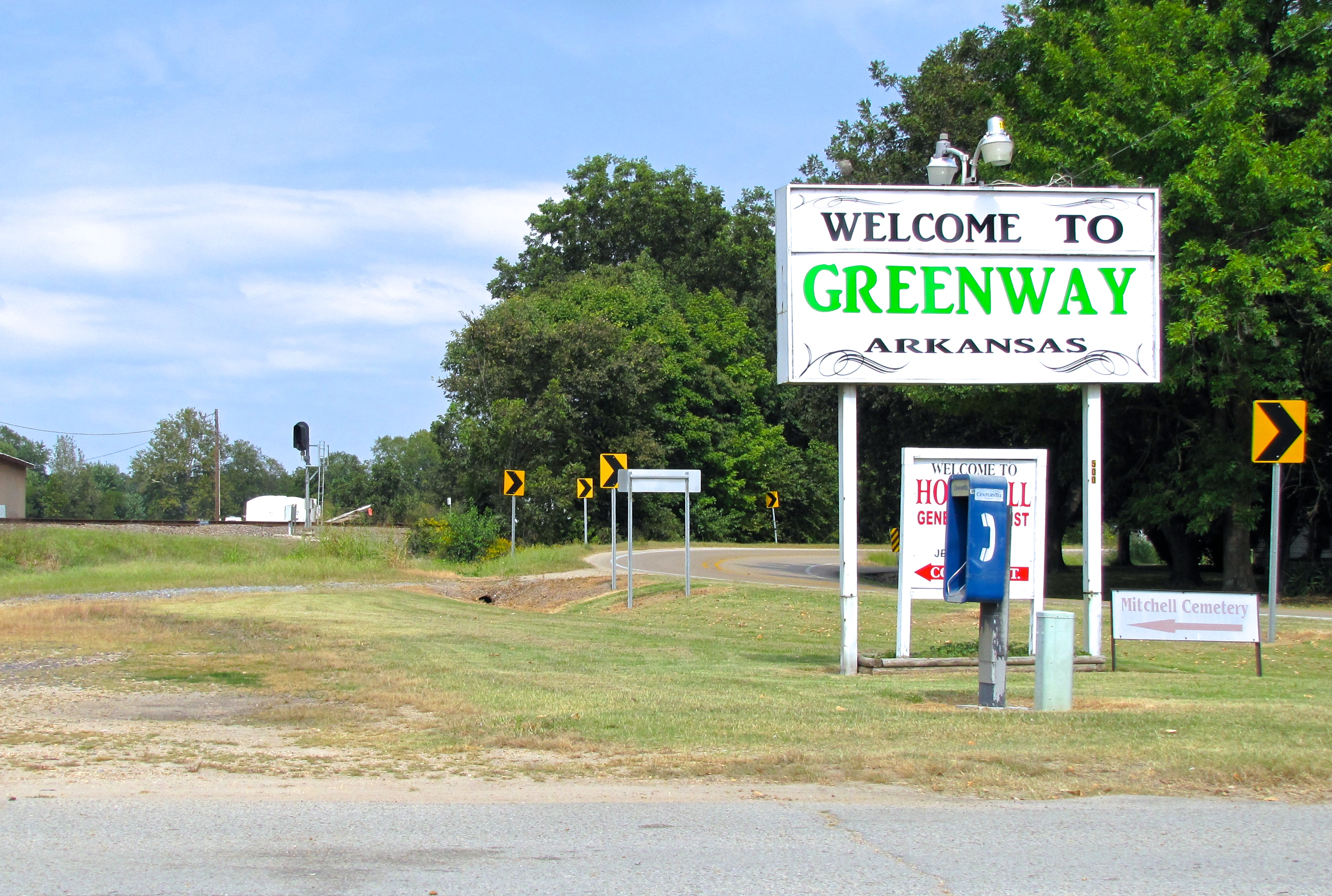
- Welcome sign in Greenway

- Location of Greenway in Clay County, Arkansas.
- Coordinates: 36°20′26″N 90°13′20″W
- Country: United States
- State: Arkansas
- County: Clay
- Established: March 13, 1886

Area
  - Total: 0.26 sq mi (0.67 km^{2})
  - Land: 0.26 sq mi (0.67 km^{2})
  - Water: 0 sq mi (0.00 km^{2})
- Elevation: 285 ft (87 m)

Population (2020)
  - Total: 174
  - Estimate (2025): 171 ▼
  - Density: 668.8/sq mi (258.24/km^{2})
- Time zone: UTC-6 (Central (CST))
  - Summer (DST): UTC-5 (CDT)
- ZIP code: 72430
- Area code: 870
- FIPS code: 05-28720
- GNIS feature ID: 2403754

Greenway is a city in eastern Clay County, Arkansas, United States. As of the 2020 census, Greenway had a population of 174.

== History ==
In 1876, W.V. Turner, a physician, established a post office known as "Clayville" (sometimes called "Hamburg") in what is now Greenway. The name was changed to "Greenway" when a railroad line (eventually part of the St. Louis Southwestern system) was constructed through the community and a depot was built. The origin of the name "Greenway" is uncertain.

== Geography ==
Greenway is situated at the eastern base of Crowley's Ridge, a few miles west of the Arkansas-Missouri state line. U.S. Route 49 connects Greenway with Piggott to the northeast and Rector to the southwest.

According to the United States Census Bureau, the town has a total area of 0.5 km^{2} (0.2 mi^{2}), all land.

== Demographics ==
Historical population
| Census | Pop. | Note | %± |
|---|---|---|---|
| 1890 | 33 | | — |
| 1900 | 165 | | 400.0% |
| 1910 | 390 | | 136.4% |
| 1920 | 362 | | −7.2% |
| 1930 | 367 | | 1.4% |
| 1940 | 303 | | −17.4% |
| 1950 | 288 | | −5.0% |
| 1960 | 179 | | −37.8% |
| 1970 | 240 | | 34.1% |
| 1980 | 317 | | 32.1% |
| 1990 | 212 | | −33.1% |
| 2000 | 244 | | 15.1% |
| 2010 | 209 | | −14.3% |
| 2020 | 174 | | −16.7% |
| 2025 (est.) | 171 | ▼ | −1.7% |
U.S. Decennial Census

At the 2000 census, there were 244 people, 104 households and 66 families residing in the town. The population density was 471.0/km^{2} (1,191.9/mi^{2}). There were 123 housing units at an average density of 237.5/km^{2} (600.8/mi^{2}). The racial makeup of the town was 99.18% White, and 0.82% from two or more races.

There were 104 households, of which 25.0% had children under the age of 18 living with them, 57.7% were married couples living together, 3.8% had a female householder with no husband present, and 35.6% were non-families. 33.7% of all households were made up of individuals, and 11.5% had someone living alone who was 65 years of age or older. The average household size was 2.35 and the average family size was 3.00.

24.2% of the population were under the age of 18, 7.4% from 18 to 24, 27.5% from 25 to 44, 26.6% from 45 to 64, and 14.3% who were 65 years of age or older. The median age was 38 years. For every 100 females, there were 114.0 males. For every 100 females age 18 and over, there were 107.9 males.

The median household income was $25,682 and the median family income was $27,500. Males had a median income of $21,591 versus $12,386 for females. The per capita income for the town was $11,533. About 11.1% of families and 16.4% of the population were below the poverty line, including 21.9% of those under the age of eighteen and 15.2% of those 65 or over.

== Education ==
Greenway is served by the Rector School District (formerly the Clay County Central School District). It was served by the Greenway School District until July 1, 1984, when it merged into the Clay County Central school district.
