= ESSO Club =

Sports bar in Clemson, South Carolina

Coordinates: 34°40′59″N 82°50′46″W

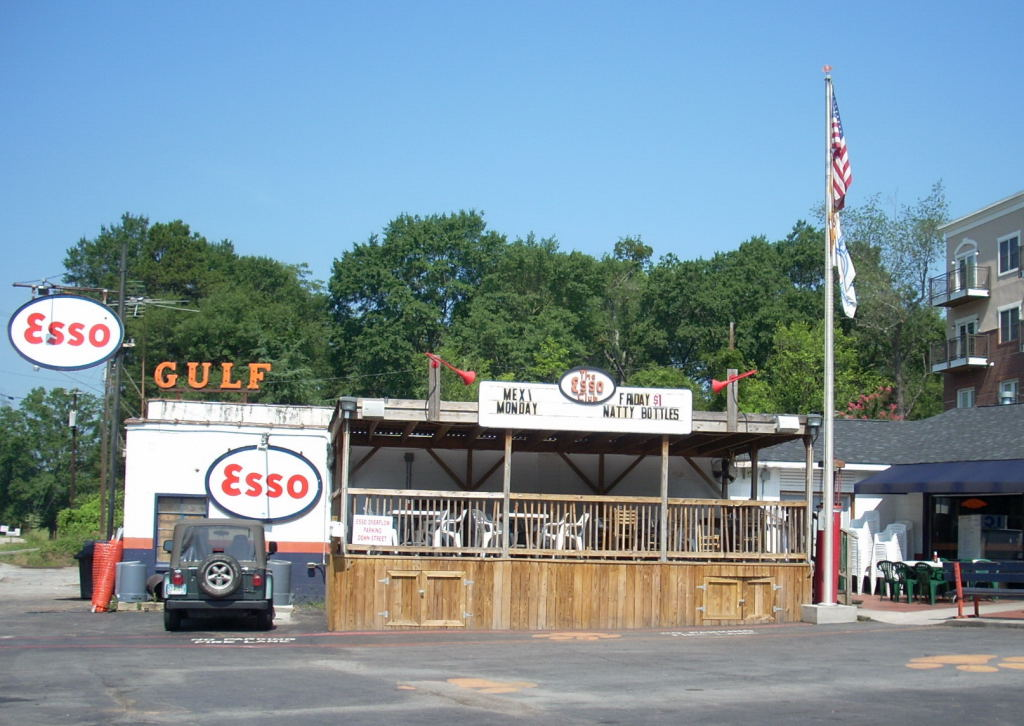
- ESSO Club in Clemson, South Carolina
- Interactive map of ESSO Club
- Location: Clemson, South Carolina, USA
- Owner: Bob Higby

Construction
- Opened: 1933

Website
- theessoclub.com

The Esso Club is a sports bar in Clemson, South Carolina, that evolved from a 1920s gas station and grocery on Old Greenville Highway, which was at the time the main highway between Atlanta, Georgia and Greenville, South Carolina. As local historians note, the corporate trademark change to Exxon went unnoticed by local patrons and the original Esso oval sign is still displayed out front. The business stopped pumping gas in the winter of 1985 and now functions as a sports bar. The Atlanta Journal-Constitution described it as the best bar in the South.

ESPN The Magazine picked the Esso Club as their top pick for college sports bars, and "patrons can taste-test the beer in a niche dubbed the 'Educational Corner'". ABC sportscaster Brent Musburger makes it a point to have a beer at the Esso when in town for Clemson football and basketball games. The authors of South Carolina Off the Beaten Path suggest going to the Esso Club to get tickets to games that are sold out years in advance, rather than the stadium.

The memorabilia in the Esso Club has been described "cool enough to qualify as museum quality." "A letter from Billy Carter, brother of President Jimmy Carter, is in the archives. The Esso Club possesses the oldest beer license in town, dating to December 1933, immediately after the 21st Amendment went into effect on December 5. The main bar is topped with the original cedar seating from Death Valley, Clemson's football stadium. New owners introduced a liquor license to the traditional beer joint for the first time in 2003.

Spitoono (or Spittoono in alternating years), a local charity fund-raising music festival organized by a loose confederation of Esso Club regulars operating as the Redneck Performing Arts Association (RPAA), was held in the parking lot from 1981 to 1990 by which time it had outgrown the available space. Spitoono moving to the Clemson National Guard Armory ballfield in 1991.
