= St. Francis, Arkansas =

- City
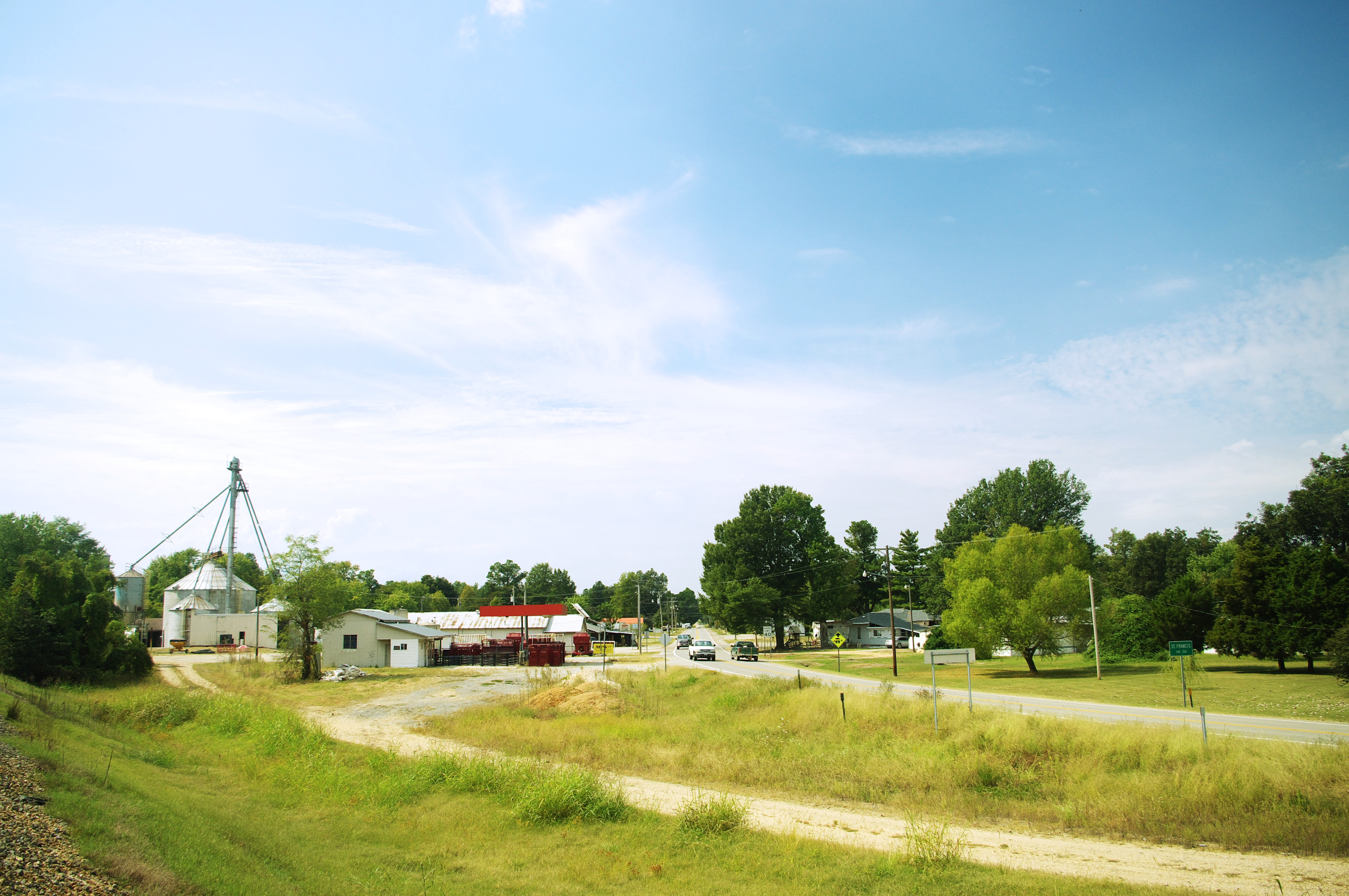
- St. Francis

- Location of St. Francis in Clay County, Arkansas.
- Coordinates: 36°27′19″N 90°08′32″W
- Country: United States
- State: Arkansas
- County: Clay
- Established: August 4, 1888

Area
  - Total: 0.37 sq mi (0.95 km^{2})
  - Land: 0.36 sq mi (0.92 km^{2})
  - Water: 0.012 sq mi (0.03 km^{2})
- Elevation: 299 ft (91 m)

Population (2020)
  - Total: 218
  - Estimate (2025): 211 ▼
  - Density: 614.7/sq mi (237.32/km^{2})
- Time zone: UTC-6 (Central (CST))
  - Summer (DST): UTC-5 (CDT)
- ZIP code: 72464
- FIPS code: 05-61970
- GNIS feature ID: 2405393

St. Francis is a city in northeastern Clay County, Arkansas, United States, along the St. Francis River. As of the 2020 census, St. Francis had a population of 218.

== History ==
The St. Francis area was settled in the 1840s, with the early residents forming the Chalk Bluff community just northwest of the present city. The Battle of Chalk Bluff was fought here in May 1863, during the Civil War. In 1882, the St. Louis Southwestern Railway ("Cotton Belt") was constructed through the area, and the Chalk Bluff community gradually shifted southeastward to a location along the railroad tracks. This new community was named "St. Francis" after the adjacent river (the river itself was named after Francis of Assisi).

== Geography ==
St. Francis is located near the northeastern corner of Clay County. It is bordered on the east by the St. Francis River, which forms the Arkansas–Missouri state line. U.S. Route 62 passes through the community, leading south and west 7 miles (11 km) to Piggott, and northeast 4 miles (6 km) to Campbell, Missouri.

According to the United States Census Bureau, St. Francis has a total area of 0.37 square miles (0.95 km^{2}), all land.

== Demographics ==
Historical population
Census	Pop.	Note	%±
1890	356		—
1900	420		18.0%
1910	459		9.3%
1920	501		9.2%
1930	294		−41.3%
1940	266		−9.5%
1950	292		9.8%
1960	224		−23.3%
1970	297		32.6%
1980	266		−10.4%
1990	201		−24.4%
2000	250		24.4%
2010	250		0.0%
2020	218		−12.8%
2025 (est.)	211	▼	−3.2%
U.S. Decennial Census

As of the census of 2000, there were 250 people, 103 households, and 70 families residing in the city. The population density was 837.1 inhabitants per square mile (323.2/km^{2}). There were 125 housing units at an average density of 418.5 per square mile (161.6/km^{2}). The racial makeup of the city was 96.80% White, 1.20% Native American, and 2.00% from two or more races. 0.40% of the population were Hispanic or Latino of any race.

There were 103 households, out of which 34.0% had children under the age of 18 living with them, 55.3% were married couples living together, 10.7% had a female householder with no husband present, and 31.1% were non-families. 27.2% of all households were made up of individuals, and 13.6% had someone living alone who was 65 years of age or older. The average household size was 2.43 and the average family size was 2.94.

In the city, the population was spread out, with 25.6% under the age of 18, 12.0% from 18 to 24, 28.0% from 25 to 44, 21.6% from 45 to 64, and 12.8% who were 65 years of age or older. The median age was 33 years. For every 100 females, there were 95.3 males. For every 100 females age 18 and over, there were 91.8 males.

The median income for a household in the city was $30,278, and the median income for a family was $33,250. Males had a median income of $19,205 versus $13,563 for females. The per capita income for the city was $11,198. About 16.9% of families and 20.2% of the population were below the poverty line, including 25.0% of those under the age of eighteen and 38.2% of those 65 or over.

== Education ==
It is in the Piggott School District.

== See also ==
- Battle of Chalk Bluff
- List of cities and towns in Arkansas
- National Register of Historic Places listings in Clay County, Arkansas
