= Esso Standard Oil Service Station (Little Rock, Arkansas) =

- U.S. National Register of Historic Places
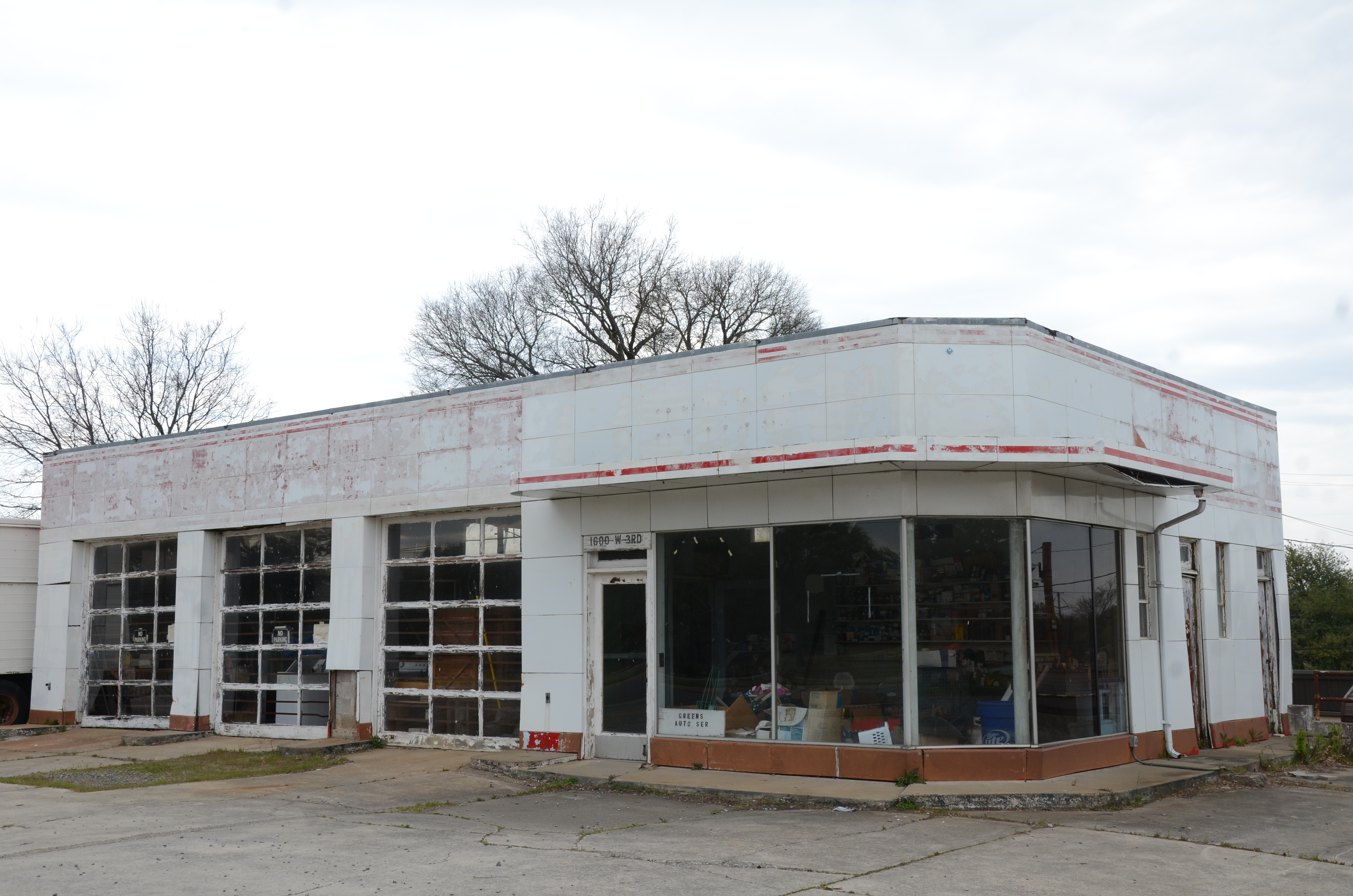

- Location within Arkansas Location within the United States
- Location: 1600 West 3rd St., Little Rock, Arkansas
- Coordinates: 34°44′55″N 92°17′21″W
- Area: less than one acre
- Built: 1957
- Built by: Esso
- Architectural style: Moderne
- MPS: Arkansas Highway History and Architecture MPS
- NRHP reference No.: 15000287
- Added to NRHP: January 8, 2016

The Esso Standard Oil Service Station is a former automobile service station at 1600 West 3rd Street in Little Rock, Arkansas. It is a single story rectangular building, built out of concrete blocks and finished with a baked enamel on steel exterior. It has three service bays on the left side, with original overhead glass-paned doors, and an office and sales space on the right side. The right side has a short canopy protruding from it, also built of concrete with a baked enamel finish. Built in 1957, it is a rare mid-century service station in the city.

The building was listed on the National Register of Historic Places in 2016.

== See also ==
- National Register of Historic Places listings in Little Rock, Arkansas
