= Nimmons, Arkansas =

- Town
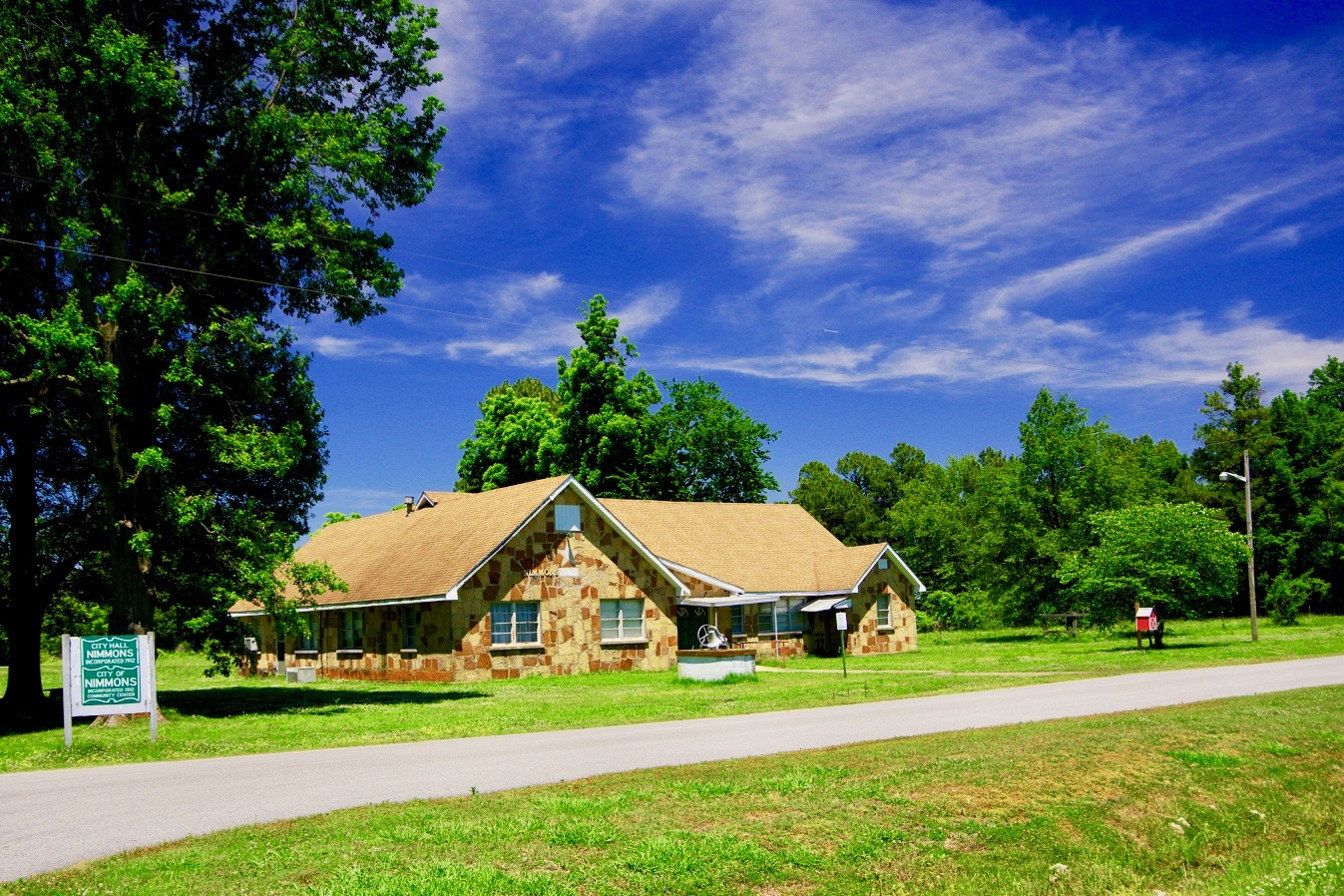
- City Hall

- Location of Nimmons in Clay County, Arkansas.
- Coordinates: 36°18′23″N 90°05′42″W
- Country: United States
- State: Arkansas
- County: Clay
- Established: January 16, 1912

Area
  - Total: 0.25 sq mi (0.65 km^{2})
  - Land: 0.25 sq mi (0.65 km^{2})
  - Water: 0 sq mi (0.00 km^{2})
- Elevation: 269 ft (82 m)

Population (2020)
  - Total: 69
  - Estimate (2025): 64 ▼
  - Density: 276.5/sq mi (106.75/km^{2})
- Time zone: UTC-6 (Central (CST))
  - Summer (DST): UTC-5 (CDT)
- FIPS code: 05-49820
- GNIS feature ID: 2406993

Nimmons is a town in Clay County, Arkansas, United States. As of the 2020 census, Nimmons had a population of 69.

== History ==
Nimmons was established as a stop along the St. Louis, Kennett and Southeastern Railroad (later part of the St. Louis–San Francisco Railway) in 1901, and was named for a railroad worker. The town was granted its own post office (since closed) in 1903, and several businesses, fueled by the timber industry, operated in the town over the next two decades. The town began to decline after timber resources in the area were exhausted.

== Geography ==
Nimmons is located in eastern Clay County 1 mile (2 km) west of the St. Francis River, which forms the Arkansas–Missouri state line. Nimmons has a total area of 0.25 square miles (0.65 km^{2}), all land.

Ecologically, Nimmons is located within the St. Francis Lowlands ecoregion within the larger Mississippi Alluvial Plain. The St. Francis Lowlands are a flat region mostly covered with row crop agriculture today, though also containing sand blows and sunken lands remaining from the 1811–12 New Madrid earthquakes. Waterways have mostly been channelized, causing loss of aquatic and riparian wildlife habitat.

== Demographics ==
Historical population
Census	Pop.	Note	%±
1920	297		—
1930	193		−35.0%
1940	217		12.4%
1950	199		−8.3%
1960	154		−22.6%
1970	135		−12.3%
1980	112		−17.0%
1990	96		−14.3%
2000	100		4.2%
2010	69		−31.0%
2020	69		0.0%
2025 (est.)	64	▼	−7.2%
U.S. Decennial Census

As of the census of 2000, there were 100 people, 44 households, and 23 families residing in the town. The population density was 154.4/km^{2} (396.7/mi^{2}). There were 50 housing units at an average density of 77.2/km^{2} (198.3/mi^{2}). The racial makeup of the town was 96.00% White and 4.00% Native American. 3.00% of the population were Hispanic or Latino of any race.

There were 44 households, out of which 20.5% had children under the age of 18 living with them, 43.2% were married couples living together, 9.1% had a female householder with no husband present, and 45.5% were non-families. 34.1% of all households were made up of individuals, and 9.1% had someone living alone who was 65 years of age or older. The average household size was 2.27 and the average family size was 3.00.

In the town, the population was spread out, with 18.0% under the age of 18, 10.0% from 18 to 24, 28.0% from 25 to 44, 28.0% from 45 to 64, and 16.0% who were 65 years of age or older. The median age was 40 years. For every 100 females, there were 88.7 males. For every 100 females age 18 and over, there were 95.2 males.

The median income for a household in the town was $28,000, and the median income for a family was $29,792. Males had a median income of $30,625 versus $13,333 for females. The per capita income for the town was $10,725. There were 22.2% of families and 36.5% of the population living below the poverty line, including 22.7% of under eighteens and 85.0% of those over 64.

== Education ==
It is in the Piggott School District.
