= Rector, Arkansas =

- City
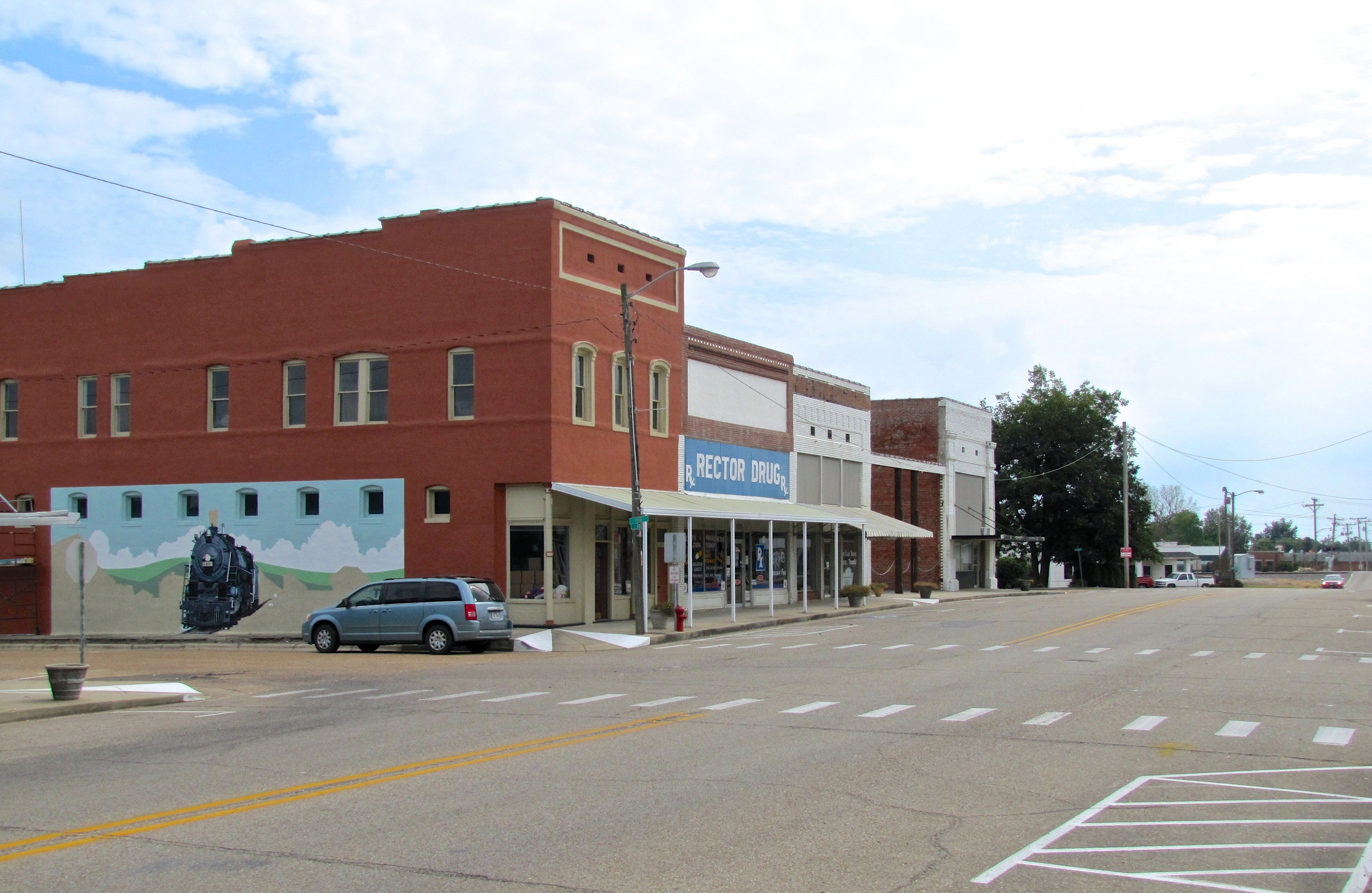
- Main Street (AR 90)

- Location of Rector in Clay County, Arkansas.
- Coordinates: 36°15′51″N 90°17′37″W
- Country: United States
- State: Arkansas
- County: Clay
- Established: September 13, 1887

Area
  - Total: 1.36 sq mi (3.53 km^{2})
  - Land: 1.36 sq mi (3.53 km^{2})
  - Water: 0 sq mi (0.00 km^{2})
- Elevation: 292 ft (89 m)

Population (2020)
  - Total: 1,862
  - Estimate (2025): 1,789 ▼
  - Density: 1,366.4/sq mi (527.58/km^{2})
- Time zone: UTC-6 (Central (CST))
  - Summer (DST): UTC-5 (CDT)
- ZIP code: 72461
- Area code: 870
- FIPS code: 05-58490
- GNIS feature ID: 2404599
- Website: rectorarkansas.gov

Rector is a city in southeastern Clay County, Arkansas, United States. As of the 2020 census, Rector had a population of 1,862.

== History ==
Rector is named after Governor Henry Massey Rector (1816–1899).

In 1881 the Texas and St. Louis Railroad laid out the town of Rector about 2 miles (3 km) to the south of an existing settlement named Scatterville, and the population of Scatterville gradually migrated to the new town.

== Geography ==
Rector is located in southern Clay County along the southeastern edge of Crowley's Ridge. U.S. Route 49 passes through the city, leading northeast 13 miles (21 km) to Piggott and southwest 7 miles (11 km) to Marmaduke. In the southern part of the city, Arkansas Highway 90 (Main Street) intersects US 49.

According to the United States Census Bureau, Rector has a total area of 1.4 square miles (3.5 km^{2}), all land.

Though a small portion of the town and surrounding area lies along Crowley’s Ridge, the majority of the town and surrounding land is flat and well-suited to farming.

== Demographics ==
Historical population
Census	Pop.	Note	%±
1890	525		—
1900	520		−1.0%
1910	1,859		257.5%
1920	1,801		−3.1%
1930	1,617		−10.2%
1940	1,736		7.4%
1950	1,855		6.9%
1960	1,757		−5.3%
1970	1,990		13.3%
1980	2,336		17.4%
1990	2,268		−2.9%
2000	2,017		−11.1%
2010	1,977		−2.0%
2020	1,862		−5.8%
2025 (est.)	1,789	▼	−3.9%
U.S. Decennial Census

=== 2020 census ===
As of the 2020 census, Rector had a population of 1,862. There were 460 families residing in the city. The median age was 41.0 years. 24.3% of residents were under the age of 18 and 23.0% of residents were 65 years of age or older. For every 100 females there were 89.6 males, and for every 100 females age 18 and over there were 84.3 males age 18 and over.

0.0% of residents lived in urban areas, while 100.0% lived in rural areas.

There were 769 households in Rector, of which 28.7% had children under the age of 18 living in them. Of all households, 42.1% were married-couple households, 19.5% were households with a male householder and no spouse or partner present, and 31.6% were households with a female householder and no spouse or partner present. About 36.3% of all households were made up of individuals and 18.1% had someone living alone who was 65 years of age or older.

There were 919 housing units, of which 16.3% were vacant. The homeowner vacancy rate was 2.5% and the rental vacancy rate was 9.2%.

Rector racial composition
Race	Number	Percentage
White (non-Hispanic)	1,693	90.92%
Black or African American (non-Hispanic)	12	0.64%
Native American	11	0.59%
Asian	1	0.05%
Pacific Islander	3	0.16%
Other/Mixed	81	4.35%
Hispanic or Latino	61	3.28%

=== 2000 census ===
As of the census of 2000, the racial makeup of the city was 98.26% White, 0.55% Native American, 0.20% Asian, and 0.99% from two or more races. 0.89% of the population were Hispanic or Latino of any race.

There were households, out of which 25.4% had children under the age of 18 living with them, 48.6% were married couples living together, 10.8% had a female householder with no husband present, and 37.6% were non-families. 35.7% of all households were made up of individuals, and 24.8% had someone living alone who was 65 years of age or older. The average household size was 2.20 and the average family size was 2.83.

In the city, the population was spread out, with 21.7% under the age of 18, 7.3% from 18 to 24, 22.7% from 25 to 44, 23.8% from 45 to 64, and 24.5% who were 65 years of age or older. The median age was 44 years. For every 100 females, there were 83.4 males. For every 100 females age 18 and over, there were 76.8 males.

The median income for a household in the city was $21,051, and the median income for a family was $29,330. Males had a median income of $27,650 versus $19,293 for females. The per capita income for the city was $14,931. About 17.9% of families and 23.9% of the population were below the poverty line, including 33.3% of those under age 18 and 31.6% of those age 65 or over.

== Annual cultural events ==
The Rector Labor Day Picnic features a rodeo, a parade, beauty pageants, and is a popular political campaign stop.

== Education ==
Public education is primarily provided by the Rector School District, which leads to graduation from Rector High School. The Rector School District was known as Clay County Central School District from 1985 until 2000. The current school district mascot is the cougar.

== Notable people ==
- Dale Alford, member of the United States House of Representatives
- Jerry Bookout, Arkansas politician
- Bill Carter, entertainment, law, Gaither Homecoming Videos
- Maurice Copeland, actor
- Edwin A. Doss, colonel for the United States Air Force
- Skeets McDonald, Rockabilly artist, famous for the song "Don't Let the Stars Get in Your Eyes"
