= Piggott, Arkansas =

- City
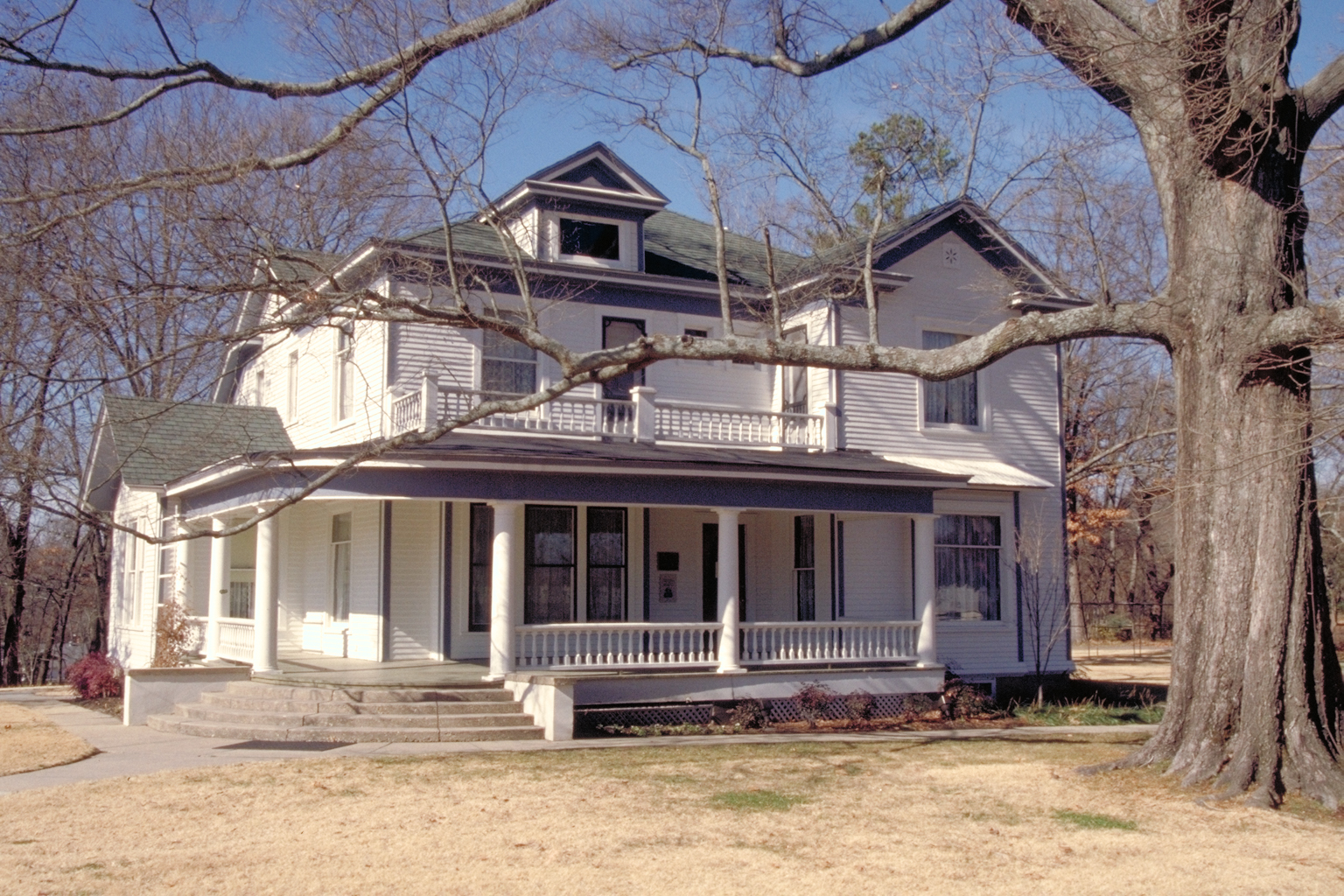
- Hemingway-Pfeiffer Museum

- Location of Piggott in Clay County, Arkansas.
- Coordinates: 36°23′09″N 90°12′06″W
- Country: United States
- State: Arkansas
- County: Clay
- Established: September 3, 1891

Area
  - Total: 5.42 sq mi (14.03 km^{2})
  - Land: 5.36 sq mi (13.89 km^{2})
  - Water: 0.054 sq mi (0.14 km^{2})
- Elevation: 322 ft (98 m)

Population (2020)
  - Total: 3,622
  - Estimate (2025): 3,508 ▼
  - Density: 675.3/sq mi (260.75/km^{2})
- Time zone: UTC-6 (Central (CST))
  - Summer (DST): UTC-5 (CDT)
- ZIP code: 72454
- Area code: 870
- FIPS code: 05-55130
- GNIS feature ID: 2404517
- Website: www.cityofpiggott.org

Piggott is a city in Clay County, Arkansas, United States. It is one of the two county seats of Clay County, along with Corning. It is the northern terminus of the Arkansas segment of the Crowley's Ridge Parkway, a National Scenic Byway. As of the 2020 census, Piggott had a population of 3,622. The town was named after James A. Piggott, one of the early settlers and initiator of the local post office.

== Geography ==
Piggott is located in eastern Clay County on the eastern edge of Crowley's Ridge. U.S. Route 62 passes through the city, running west 25 miles (40 km) to Corning and northeast 45 miles (72 km) to Interstate 55 at New Madrid, Missouri. The northern terminus of U.S. Route 49 is in Piggott; the highway runs southwest 32 miles (51 km) to Paragould, and 516 miles (830 km) to Gulfport, Mississippi.

According to the United States Census Bureau, Piggott has a total area of 5.3 square miles (13.6 km^{2}), of which 5.2 square miles (13.5 km^{2}) is land and 0.04 square miles (0.1 km^{2}), or 1.01%, is water.

The topography of Piggott is mostly flat in the eastern half of the city with the more developed western half lying along Crowley’s Ridge, creating a sensation of coming down from a small mount to the flatland below. This ridge is a naturally occurring phenomenon created over millennia by wind-blown periglacial loess and possibly by seismic activity in the region.

== Demographics ==
Historical population
Census	Pop.	Note	%±
1900	597		—
1910	1,150		92.6%
1920	2,016		75.3%
1930	1,885		−6.5%
1940	2,034		7.9%
1950	2,558		25.8%
1960	2,776		8.5%
1970	3,087		11.2%
1980	3,762		21.9%
1990	3,777		0.4%
2000	3,894		3.1%
2010	3,849		−1.2%
2020	3,622		−5.9%
2025 (est.)	3,508	▼	−3.1%
U.S. Decennial Census

=== 2020 census ===
Piggott racial composition
Race	Number	Percentage
White (non-Hispanic)	3,385	93.46%
Black or African American (non-Hispanic)	13	0.36%
Native American	5	0.14%
Asian	2	0.06%
Other/Mixed	107	2.95%
Hispanic or Latino	110	3.04%

As of the 2020 census, there were 3,622 people, 1,589 households, and 955 families residing in the city.

The median age was 42.0 years. 22.4% of residents were under the age of 18 and 22.4% were 65 years of age or older. For every 100 females, there were 89.0 males, and for every 100 females age 18 and over, there were 85.8 males age 18 and over.

0.0% of residents lived in urban areas, while 100.0% lived in rural areas.

Of all households, 26.8% had children under the age of 18 living in them. 42.0% were married-couple households, 17.6% were households with a male householder and no spouse or partner present, and 33.9% were households with a female householder and no spouse or partner present. About 33.6% of all households were made up of individuals, and 18.4% had someone living alone who was 65 years of age or older.

There were 1,886 housing units, of which 16.4% were vacant. The homeowner vacancy rate was 3.9% and the rental vacancy rate was 17.5%.

=== 2000 census ===
As of the census of 2000, there were 3,894 people, 1,726 households, and 1,101 families residing in the city. The population density was 751.8 inhabitants per square mile (290.3/km^{2}). There were 1,912 housing units at an average density of 369.1 per square mile (142.5/km^{2}). The racial makeup of the city was 98.59% White, 0.23% Black or African American, 0.18% Native American, 0.18% from other races, and 0.82% from two or more races. 0.77% of the population were Hispanic or Latino of any race.

There were 1,726 households, out of which 27.0% had children under the age of 18 living with them, 52.0% were married couples living together, 9.4% had a female householder with no husband present, and 36.2% were non-families. 33.0% of all households were made up of individuals, and 20.6% had someone living alone who was 65 years of age or older. The average household size was 2.20 and the average family size was 2.79.

In the city, the population was spread out, with 22.1% under the age of 18, 7.4% from 18 to 24, 23.9% from 25 to 44, 23.3% from 45 to 64, and 23.2% who were 65 years of age or older. The median age was 42 years. For every 100 females, there were 87.3 males. For every 100 females age 18 and over, there were 79.6 males.

The median income for a household in the city was $25,404, and the median income for a family was $35,625. Males had a median income of $25,482 versus $19,405 for females. The per capita income for the city was $16,382. About 8.1% of families and 9.9% of the population were below the poverty line, including 15.2% of those under age 18 and 15.9% of those age 65 or over.

== Government ==
Piggott City Hall

=== Voting districts ===
- State Senate District: 20
- State House District: 56
- U.S. Congressional District: 1

== Education ==
The Piggott School District is composed of two campuses. Piggott Elementary School is the campus for grades K-6, while Piggott High School is composed of grades 7-12. As of October 2024, 410 students were enrolled at the elementary school and 330 were enrolled at the high school. The schools offer several extracurricular activities for students including athletics, band, and various clubs and organizations. The athletic program includes boys' football, tennis, basketball, baseball, golf, and track and field. Girls' sports include basketball, volleyball, tennis, softball, track and field, and golf. Most recently, the school added a skeet shooting team to its list of activities. PHS also opened a new gymnasium during the 2007-2008 athletic season.

== Cultural references ==
Piggott is perhaps best known for its association with American writer and Nobel laureate Ernest Hemingway, whose second wife Pauline Pfeiffer was the daughter of prominent local landowner and businessman Paul Pfeiffer. After meeting and marrying in Paris in the late 1920s, Hemingway and Pauline made frequent and lengthy visits to her parents' home in Piggott, where Ernest Hemingway wrote portions of A Farewell to Arms, and other works. The Pfeiffer House and Carriage House are now preserved as the Hemingway-Pfeiffer Museum and Educational Center, run by Arkansas State University.

The Piggott Post Office is the home of an oil-on-canvas mural "Air Mail" painted in 1941 by Dan Rhodes and funded by the Treasury Section of Fine Arts, a New Deal public art program. The mural was featured on a sheet of U.S. postage stamps, "Post Office Murals," issued on April 10, 2019.

== Notable people ==
- Leslie Biffle, Secretary of the United States Senate from 1945 to 1947 and 1949 to 1953
- Frances Greer, opera singer
- Pauline Pfeiffer, second wife of Ernest Hemingway
