= Rector =

Rector (Latin for the member of a vessel's crew who steers) may refer to:

== Style or title ==
- Rector (ecclesiastical), a cleric who functions as an administrative leader in some Christian denominations
- Rector (academia), a senior official in an educational institution
  - Rector of the University of Aberdeen
  - Rector of the University of Dundee
  - Rector of the University of Edinburgh
  - Rector of the University of Glasgow
  - Rector of the University of St Andrews
- Rector (politics)
  - Rector (Ragusa), an official in the government of the Republic of Ragusa
- Rector (Islam) – the leading official of the Grand Mosque of Paris and of some other mosques

== Surname ==
- Rector (surname)
- David the Rector (1745–1824), Georgian pedagogue

== Places ==
=== United States ===
- Rector, Arkansas, city
- Rector, Missouri, extinct town
- Rector, Pennsylvania, unincorporated community
- Rector Reservoir, a reservoir in Napa Valley, California

== Other ==
- Rector Street (IRT Broadway–Seventh Avenue Line), a station on the IRT Broadway–Seventh Avenue Line of the New York City Subway
- Rector Street (BMT Broadway Line), a station on the BMT Broadway Line of the New York City Subway
- Rector Street (IRT Ninth Avenue Line), a station on the demolished IRT Ninth Avenue Line
- Rector Street (IRT Sixth Avenue Line), IRT station was a station on the demolished IRT Sixth Avenue Line in Lower Manhattan
- Rector Street (Manhattan), a street in the financial district of New York City
- Rector High School, a public high school in Rector, Arkansas, United States
- Rector House, a historic house in Heber Springs, Arkansas
- Rector Log Barn, a historic barn in rural Izard County, Arkansas
- Rector Road Bridge, a historic truss bridge in Denton, Texas.
- Rector School District
- Rector Waterworks Building, a historic building in Rector, Arkansas

== See also ==
- Rector Street (disambiguation)
- Justice Rector (disambiguation)
- John Rector (disambiguation)
