= Love's Law =

1917 silent drama film

- Directed by: Tefft Johnson
- Written by: Mary Murillo
- Produced by: William Fox
- Starring: Joan Sawyer; Stuart Holmes; Olga Grey
- Cinematography: Maxwell Held
- Production company: Fox Film
- Distributed by: Fox Film
- Release date: March 12, 1917
- Running time: 50 minutes
- Country: United States
- Languages: Silent; English intertitles

Love's Law is a 1917 American silent drama film directed by Tefft Johnson and starring Joan Sawyer, Stuart Holmes and Olga Grey.

== Cast ==
- Joan Sawyer as Innocence, later Moner Moyer
- Stuart Holmes as Andre
- Olga Grey as Jealousy
- Leo Delaney as Undetermined Role
- Richard Neill as Undetermined Role

== Bibliography ==
- Solomon, Aubrey. The Fox Film Corporation, 1915-1935: A History and Filmography. McFarland, 2011.
