= Snakeville =

American comedy short film series

Snakeville (1911–1915) is an American comedy short film series popular during the silent film era in the United States. It was produced by Essanay Studio's Gilbert M. Anderson (Broncho Billy).

David Kirkland, who went on to direct films, portrayed Dr. Dopem in the series. Victor Potel was "Slippery Slim", and True Eames Boardman, Emory Johnson and Josephine Rector also appeared.

== Filmography ==
- The Infant at Snakeville (1911), cast included Harry Todd
- Snakeville's Fire Brigade (1914)
- Snakeville's Home Guard (1914)
- The Awakening at Snakeville (1914), cast includes Augustus Carney
- When Snakeville Struck Oil (1915)
- It Happened in Snakeville (1915)
- Snakeville's Beauty Parlor (1915)
- Versus Sledge Hammer (1915)

== See also ==
- Alkali Ike
