= Alkali Ike =

Film series

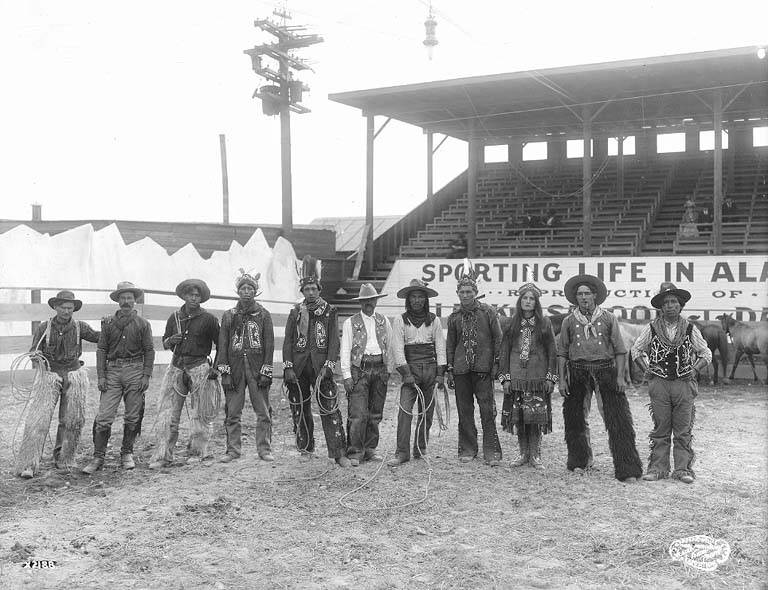
Performers from Alkali Ike's Wild West Show, Pay Streak, at the Alaska Yukon Pacific Exhibition in Seattle (1909)

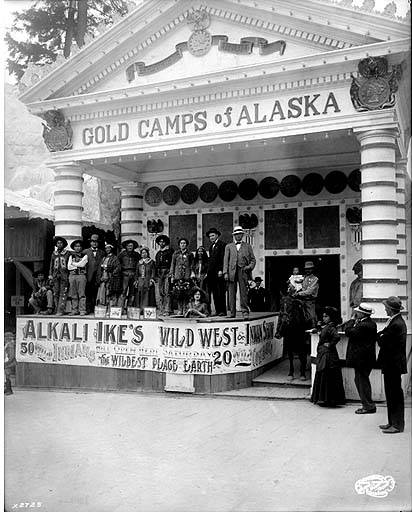
Another Alkali Ike show at the Exposition

Alkali Ike is a series of short comedy films released during the silent film era by Essanay Studios and later by Universal Pictures. Gilbert M. Anderson was involved with producing them and directed several. Augustus Carney portrayed Alkali Ike, and Harry Todd co-starred in the film series as the character Mustang Pete. Margaret Joslin and Lily Branscombe also appeared in many installments of the series.

The Library of Philadelphia has an advertisement for the "Alkali" Ike's Auto episode.

== At Universal ==
Universal poached Carney and used the character renamed Universal Ike for a series of comedic films. It was part of its Joker Comedies series.

== Other uses and adaptations of the name "Alkali Ike" ==
- There is a song titled "Alkali Ike Rag".
- Baseball player Grover Cleveland Alexander was nicknamed "Alkali Pete" by combining part of the names of the two lead characters in the film series: Alkali Ike and Mustang Pete.
- Marvel Comics' Earth-616 has a character named Alkali Ike.

== Filmography ==
- Alkali Ike's Auto (1911)
- Alkali Ike's Motorcycle (1912)
- Alkali Ike Plays the Devil (1912)
- Alkali Ike's Boarding House (1912)
- Alkali Bests Broncho Billy (1912)
- Alkali Ike's Pants (1912)
- Alkali Ike's Misfortune (1913)
- Alkali Ike's Gal (1913)
- Alkali Ike and the Wildman (1913)
- Universal Ike Gets a Goat

== See also ==
- Snakeville
