= Girl at Home =

Girl at Home may refer to:

- "Girl at Home", a 2011 song by Trey Songz from the mixtape Anticipation II
- "Girl at Home", a 2012 song by Taylor Swift from the album Red
  - "Girl at Home (Taylor's Version)", a 2021 re-recording of the song by Taylor Swift from the re-recorded album Red (Taylor's Version)

== See also ==
- The Girl at Home, a 1917 silent film by Paramount Pictures
