= Gott fähret auf mit Jauchzen, BWV 43 =

Church cantata by Johann Sebastian Bach

Gott fähret auf mit Jauchzen
- BWV 43
- Church cantata by Johann Sebastian Bach
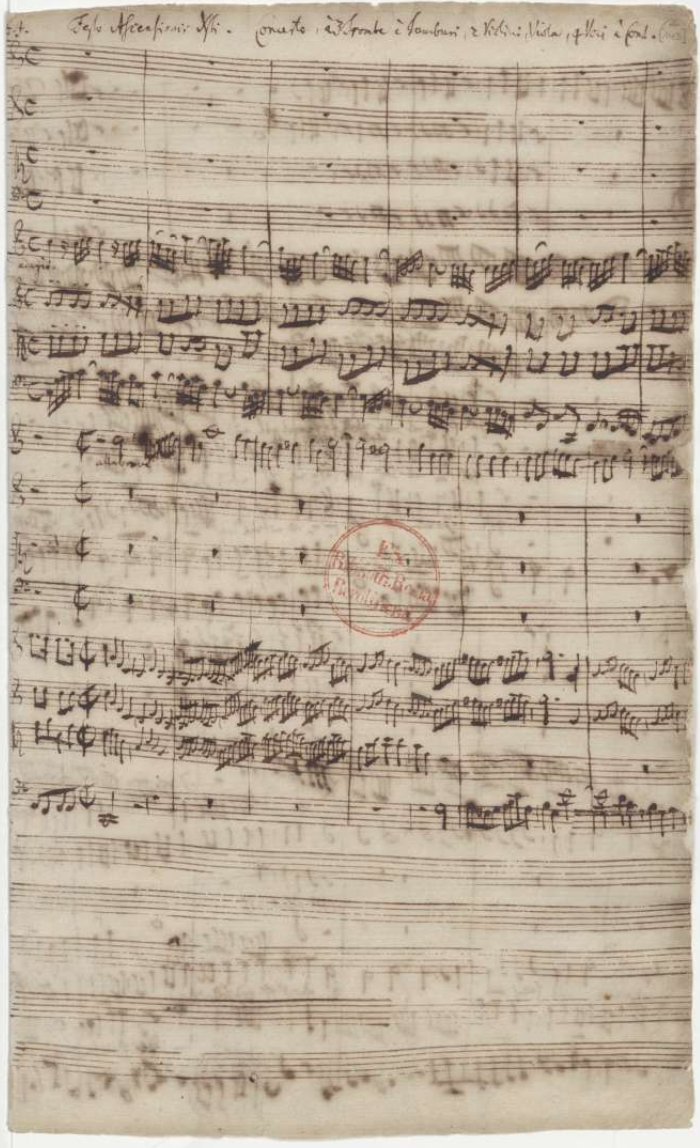
- First page of Bach's autograph score
- Occasion: Feast of the Ascension
- Bible text: Psalms 47:5–7; Mark 16:14–20
- Chorale: by Johann Rist
- Performed: 30 May 1726: Leipzig
- Movements: 11 in two parts (5 + 6)
- Vocal: SATB soloists and choir
- Instrumental: 3 trumpets; timpani; 2 oboes; 2 violins; viola; continuo

Gott fähret auf mit Jauchzen ("God goes up with jubilation" or "God has gone up with a shout"), BWV 43, (Note: "BWV" is Bach-Werke-Verzeichnis, a thematic catalogue of Bach's works.) is a church cantata by Johann Sebastian Bach. He composed it in Leipzig for the Feast of the Ascension, and led the first performance on 30 May 1726. The work is part of Bach's third cantata cycle.

Bach wrote the music during his third year as Thomaskantor, the church music director of Leipzig. After two years of composing new cantatas for the occasions of the liturgical year, he began his third year by performing music by others, especially his cousin Johann Ludwig Bach. In Gott fähret auf mit Jauchzen, Bach used his cousin's cantata format, which featured a poem as text, in addition to quotations from the Old and New Testaments and closing chorale music. The Biblical quotations were taken from Psalm 47, traditionally understood as a reference to the Ascension, and from the prescribed Gospel for the occasion, Mark 16. The closing chorale consists of two stanzas from "Du Lebensfürst, Herr Jesu Christ" with text by Johann Rist.

Bach structured the cantata in eleven movements, split into two parts: one to be performed before the sermon, and one to be performed after. The opening chorus and the closing chorale are sung by the choir, framing a sequence of alternating recitatives and arias. Bach scored the cantata festively for four vocal soloists, a four-part choir, three trumpets, timpani, two oboes, strings and basso continuo. Due to the long text, the work features short arias and five recitatives, most of them secco. The opening chorus has a complex structure with a slow introduction and several fugal developments.

== History ==
=== Background ===
Bach was appointed Thomaskantor (director of church music) in Leipzig in 1723, making him responsible for the music at four Lutheran churches and for the training and education of the boys singing in the Thomanerchor boys' choir. He took office on 30 May 1723, performing his church cantata Die Elenden sollen essen, BWV 75, for the first Sunday after Trinity. Leipzig had a liturgy of the same prescribed readings from the Bible every year for Sundays and feast days of the liturgical year, including feasts of saints, of Mary, and three days of celebrating the high holidays of Christmas, Easter and Pentecost; cantata music was expected to match the readings for all occasions except during the "silent times" of Advent (before Christmas) and Lent (before Easter). In the new position, Bach decided, instead of using existing music, to compose new church cantatas for almost all liturgical events for the first twelve months; they became his first cantata cycle. The following year, Bach went on to write a second cantata cycle, now basing each cantata on a Lutheran hymn. In his book Johann Sebastian Bach: The Learned Musician, Christoph Wolff described the endeavour as "a most promising project of great homogeneity, whose scope he was able to define himself".

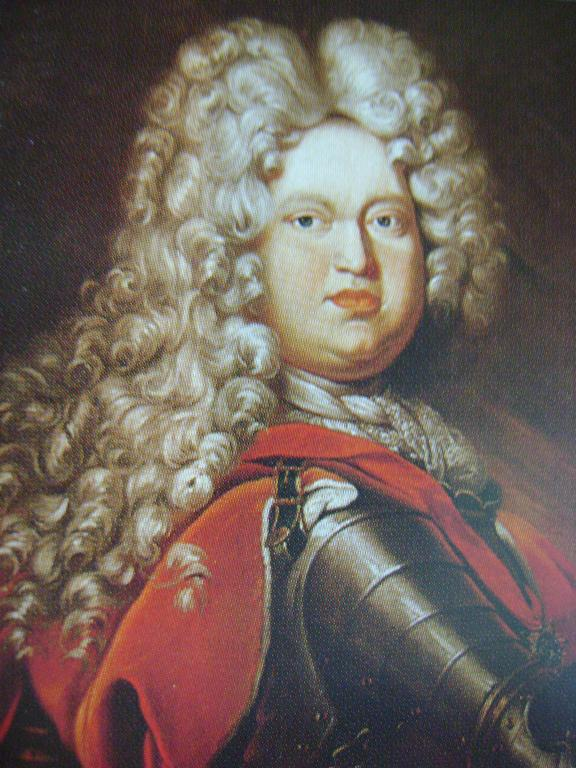
Duke Ernst Ludwig

In 1725, his third year in the post, Bach slowed down his composing and began to perform cantatas by others, especially by his cousin Johann Ludwig Bach, who was court musician in Saxe-Meiningen. The texts for these cantatas were published during the 1704/05 church year in Rudolstadt in 1725, without naming an author; they could have been written by Ernst Ludwig, Duke of Saxe-Meiningen. The texts followed a specific format: Old Testament quotation, recitative, aria, New Testament quotation, poem, concluded by a chorale, differing from Bach's earlier cantata texts by the inclusion of a poem.

Bach composed few cantatas during his third year in Leipzig. For the Christmas season, he wrote several cantatas to older librettos, especially by Georg Christian Lehms. Bach composed the Ascension cantata after three months of performing his cousin's works. He used his cousin's text format for this cantata and six others to follow. It is unclear if he possessed his cousin's cycle only partly and had to supply substitutes for missing works, or if he regarded some as unfit for the Leipzig audience.

=== Readings and text ===
The prescribed readings for the Ascension feast day were from the Acts of the Apostles, the prologue and Ascension narrative (Acts 1:1–11), and from the Gospel of Mark, Jesus telling his disciples to preach and baptise, and his Ascension (Mark 16:14–20).

The text of the cantata is unusual as it consists mostly of a poem in six stanzas, which is used for six consecutive movements (5 to 10). The first quotation is taken from Psalm 47 (Psalms 47:5–7), a text traditionally understood as a reference to the Ascension. The other quotation is verse 19 from the Gospel of Mark. For the following pair of recitative and aria between the quotations, an unknown librettist paraphrased both an idea from Psalm 68 (Psalms 68:18) and its quotation in the Epistle to the Ephesians (Ephesians 4:8), "when he ascended up on high, he led captivity captive".

The poem may have existed separately, quoted by the librettist. It praises salvation through Jesus, the defeat of Satan, and the hope for an eternal dwelling with Jesus. It is full of Biblical references, including the theme of Christ in the winepress, following Isaiah 63:3, and alludes to the vision of Saint Stephen of an open heaven, according to Acts 7:56.

The cantata is closed by the first and thirteenth stanza of Johann Rist's hymn "Du Lebensfürst, Herr Jesu Christ", published in 1641. Bach would later use the fourth stanza of the chorale for his Ascension Oratorio. The cantata consists of two parts, performed before and after the sermon respectively. This division was not indicated in the Rudolstadt print.

=== Performance ===
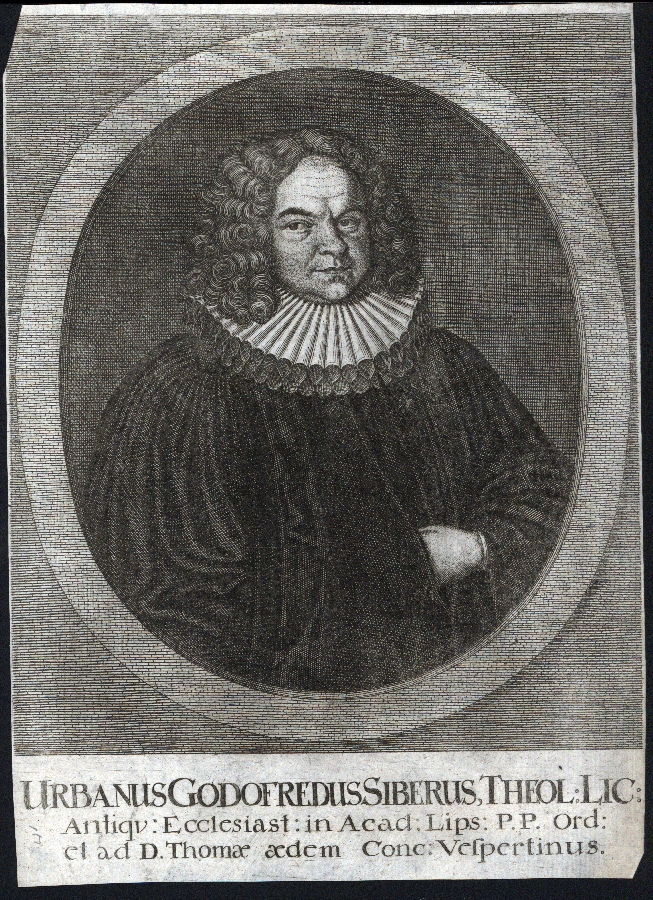
Urban Gottfried Sieber, a preacher in Leipzig

Bach led the Thomanerchor in the first performance on 30 May 1726, in a morning service at the Nikolaikirche, with a sermon delivered by Salomon Deyling; it was performed again the same day in a vespers service at the Thomaskirche, probably with a sermon by Urban Gottfried Sieber. The cantata belongs to Bach's third cantata cycle. Another performance by Bach is documented by a violin part, but it cannot be dated. Bach's son Wilhelm Friedemann Bach, who inherited a set of parts, performed the cantata's first part at least twice in Halle.

== Music ==
=== Structure and scoring ===
Bach structured the cantata in eleven movements, in two parts. The outer movements—the opening chorus and the closing chorale—are sung by the choir, and frame a sequence of alternating recitatives and arias. The work is scored for four vocal soloists (soprano (S), alto (A), tenor (T), bass (B)), a four-part choir and a festive Baroque instrumental ensemble of three trumpets (Tr), timpani (Ti), two oboes (Ob), two violins (Vl), viola (Va), and basso continuo. Alfred Dürr noted in his book Die Kantaten von Johann Sebastian Bach that this scoring is almost as opulent as that of the later Ascension Oratorio. The title page of the original parts reads: "Festo Ascens. Xsti. / Gott fähret auf mit Jauchzen / a / 4 Voci / & Trombe / Tamburi / & Hautb. / & Viol. / Viola / e / Cont. / di / J. S. Bach", which means "Feast of the Ascension of Christ / Gott fähret auf mit Jauchzen / for 4 voices, & trumpets, timpani, & oboes, violins, viola, & continuo, by J. S. Bach". Dürr gave the duration as 25 minutes.

In the following table, the scoring follows the Neue Bach-Ausgabe. The keys and time signatures are taken from Dürr, using the symbols for common time (4/4) and alla breve (2/2). The continuo, playing throughout, is not shown.

Movements of Gott fähret auf mit Jauchzen, Part I
No.	Title	Type	Vocal	Brass	Winds	Strings	Key	Time
	Part I							
1	Gott fähret auf mit Jauchzen	Chorus	SATB	3Tr Ti	2Ob	2Vl, Va	C major	common time
2	Es will der Höchste sich ein Siegsgepräng bereiten	Recitative	T					common time
3	Ja tausendmal tausend begleiten den Wagen	Aria	T			2Vl	G major	6/8
4	Und der Herr, nachdem er mit ihnen geredet hatte	Recitative	S					common time
5	Mein Jesus hat nunmehr	Aria	S		2Ob	2Vl, Va	E minor	common time
	Part II							
6	Es kommt der Helden Held	Recitative	B			2Vl, Va	C major	common time
7	Er ists, der ganz allein	Aria	B	Tr			C major	common time
8	Der Vater hat ihm ja	Recitative	A					common time
9	Ich sehe schon im Geist	Aria	A		2Ob		A minor	3/4
10	Er will mir neben sich	Recitative	S					common time
11	Du Lebensfürst, Herr Jesu Christ	Chorale	SATB	3Tr Ti	2Ob	2Vl, Va	G major	common time

=== Movements ===
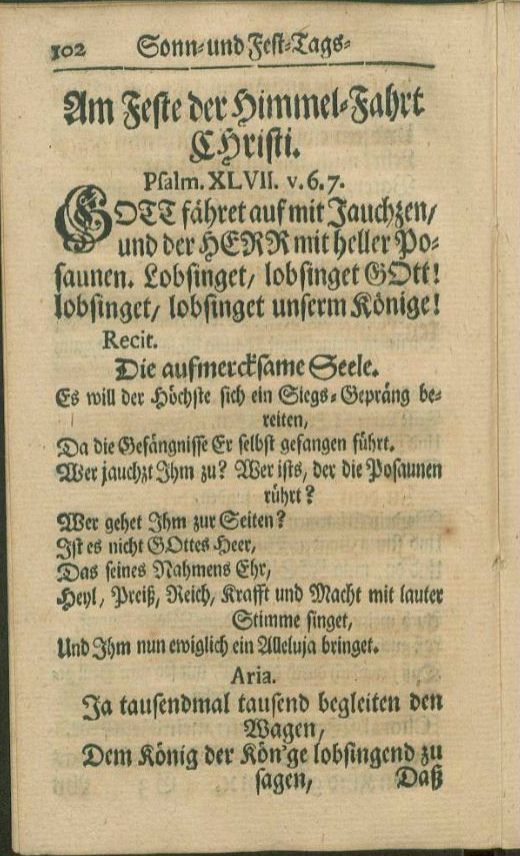
First page from a 1726 (second edition) print of the libretto from Rudolstadt

Michael Märker, the editor of a critical edition for Carus, notes that the cantata begins with an imposing opening chorus, which, as in Bach's Orchestral suites, nothing that follows can balance. The Bach scholar Klaus Hofmann calls the first movement the "centre of gravity", and Dürr the "dominant movement". Due to the long text, the work features unusually short arias and five recitatives, most of them secco, with the exception of the one beginning Part II. Dürr believes that Bach may have taken not only his cousin's text format but also his music-making as a model.

==== 1 ====
The opening chorus with the full orchestra, "Gott fähret auf mit Jauchzen und der Herr mit heller Posaunen" (God goes up with jubilation and the Lord with bright trumpets), opens with an introduction marked adagio, played by the strings, which are doubled by the oboes. Then a fugue begins: two instrumental entries are followed by the choir which presents first entrance of the theme with a setting in homophony; a climax is reached in an entry of the first trumpet, signalling the end of the first fugal exposition. A second fugal exposition, repeating the text, includes remote and minor keys. The second part of the text, "lobsinget Gott, lobsinget unserm Könige" (sing praises to God, sing praises unto our King) is first again sung in homophony using the same theme as the first entrance; after an instrumental passage, it is set again in a third fugal exposition, followed by a homophonic coda.

==== 2 ====
A secco recitative for the tenor, "Es will der Höchste sich ein Siegsgepräng bereiten" (The Highest prepares for himself a triumphal procession), expresses that God makes the prisons captives, in syllabic declamation.

==== 3 ====
In the first aria, "Ja tausend mal tausend begleiten den Wagen" (Indeed thousand upon thousands accompany the chariots), the tenor is accompanied by the violins in unison. The complete text is sung three times in different sections. Hans-Joachim Schulze notes that the "energetic repeated pitches, spacious broken chords, and sweeping passages" give the aria a heroic character, although the triple meter might indicate a type of dance.

==== 4 ====
The New Testament quotation about the Ascension, "Und der Herr, nachdem er mit ihnen geredet hatte, ward er aufgehoben gen Himmel und sitzet zur rechten Hand Gottes." (And the Lord, after he had spoken with them, was taken up into heaven and sits at the right hand of God.), is sung not by the tenor as Bach's usual voice of the Evangelist, but instead by the soprano who delivers it in a secco recitative.

==== 5 ====
The fifth movement concludes Part I and is based on the first stanza of the poem, "Mein Jesus hat nunmehr das Heilandwerk vollendet" (My Jesus has now completed the work of salvation). The soprano is accompanied by the strings, which are doubled by the oboes. In the middle section, the words "Er schließt der Erde Lauf" (He finishes His course on earth, literally: "He finishes the course of the earth") are expressed by an upward melisma and one downward on the repeat of the words. Schulze characterises the aria as introverted and sympathetic.

==== 6 ====
The recitative, "Es kommt der Helden Held, des Satans Fürst und Schrecken" (The hero of heroes comes, the terror and bane of Satan,), is sung by the bass. In the strings, triadic fanfares alternate with soft tremolo, illustrating the drama of the text with contrasting aspects of power and anxiousness.

==== 7 ====
The bass continues in an aria, "Er ists, der ganz allein die Kelter hat getreten" (It is he, who completely alone has trod upon the winepress). It is highlighted by an obbligato trumpet part, which Schulze saw as a symbol of the "solitariness of the victor". The trumpet part proved so difficult that Bach gave it to a violin in a later performance. Repeated figures in the continuo may illustrate the treading in the winepress. The words "voll Schmerzen, Qual und Pein" (full of sorrow, torment and pain) are illustrated by a slower tempo and harmonic tension.

==== 8 ====
In this recitative for the alto, "Der Vater hat ihm ja ein ewig Reich bestimmet" (The Father has indeed ordained for him an eternal Kingdom), the vocal line concludes with a reference to the view towards heaven, expressed by an upward coloratura motion.

==== 9 ====
The alto aria, "Ich sehe schon im Geist, wie er zu Gottes Rechten auf seine Feinde schmeißt" (I see already in spirit, how he, at God's right hand, smites his enemies). is accompanied by the oboes. It expresses the joy of victory over the enemies, in a dance-like vision of peace rather than a description of a battle, but stresses the words "aus Jammer, Not und Schmach" (out of suffering, distress and ignominy) by "harmonic darkening". Schulze notes that in the second part, like in the first, a tranquil aria follows one full of tension, here ignoring aspects of the text.

==== 10 ====
A soprano recitative, "Er will mir neben sich die Wohnung zubereiten" (He will prepare next to him a dwelling-place for me), expresses a vision of a heavenly dwelling.

==== 11 ====
The closing chorale in two stanzas, "Du Lebensfürst, Herr Jesu Christ" (O Prince of Life, Lord Jesus Christ), is a four-part chorale setting of the melody of "Ermuntre dich, mein schwacher Geist", composed by Johann Schop in 1641. In a rarity for Bach, the setting was not composed by him; he took it from the 1682 Neu Leipziger Gesangbuch hymnal by Gottfried Vopelius, with only slight alterations. The oldest source for the hymn, the 1655 collection Andachts Zymbeln (Devotional cymbals) by Christoph Peter, cantor in Guben, was not at Bach's disposal.

According to the parts, the instruments play colla parte with the voices: two trumpets, the oboes and two violins with the soprano, and one trumpet and viola with the alto. Märker notes that the soprano and alto lines were too low for trumpets to play along, and that Dürr suggested that trumpeters played violins for that movement.

== Manuscripts and publication ==
The manuscripts of both the score and parts have survived and are held by the Berlin State Library.

The first critical edition of the cantata, edited by Wilhelm Rust, was published by the Bach Gesellschaft in 1860 as part of its complete edition of Bach's works. The cantata was published in the Neue Bach-Ausgabe, the second edition of Bach's works, in 1960, edited by Dürr. Carus published a critical edition in German and English in 1999 as part of its Stuttgarter Bach-Ausgaben, edited by Michael Märker. In the 21st century, Bach Digital published high-resolution facsimile images of the manuscript parts from the first quarter of the 18th century.

== Recordings ==
The following table is a selection from Bach Cantatas website, where 22 recordings are listed as of 2026. Instrumental groups playing period instruments in historically informed performances are marked by the word "Period" and the colour green in the Instr. column.

Recordings of Gott fähret auf mit Jauchzen, BWV 43
Title	Conductor / Choir / Orchestra	Soloists	Label	Year	Instr.
J. S. Bach: Kantaten BWV 21, 110 (Ramin Edition Vol. 9)	Günther Ramin Thomanerchor Gewandhausorchester	Gertrud Birmele; Eva Fleischer; Gert Lutze; Johannes Oettel	Archiv Produktion	1951	
Les Grandes Cantates de J. S. Bach Vol. 9	Fritz Werner Heinrich-Schütz-Chor Heilbronn Pforzheim Chamber Orchestra	Friederike Sailer; Claudia Hellmann; Helmut Krebs; Jakob Stämpfli	Erato	1961	
Bach Kantaten, Vol. 4: BWV 127, BWV 159, BWV 43	Diethard Hellmann Bachchor Mainz Bachorchester Mainz	Nobuko Gamo-Yamamoto; Annelies Westen; Horst Wilhelm; Dieter Slembeck	SWF	late 1960s?	
J. S. Bach: Das Kantatenwerk (1)	Hans Grischkat Schwäbischer Singkreis Bach-Orchester Stuttgart	Csilla Zentai; Erika Schmidt; Kurt Huber; Michael Schopper	Corona	1971	
J. S. Bach: Das Kantatenwerk • Complete Cantatas • Les Cantates, Folge / Vol. 3	Nikolaus Harnoncourt Wiener Sängerknaben Concentus Musicus Wien	boy soprano of the Wiener Sängerknaben; Paul Esswood; Kurt Equiluz; Ruud van der Meer	Teldec	1975	Period
Die Bach Kantate Vol. 34	Helmuth Rilling Gächinger Kantorei Bach-Collegium Stuttgart	Arleen Auger; Julia Hamari; Lutz-Michael Harder; Philippe Huttenlocher	Hänssler	1982	
J. S. Bach: Himmelfahrts-Oratorium	Philippe Herreweghe Collegium Vocale Gent	Barbara Schlick; Catherine Patriasz; Christoph Prégardien; Peter Kooy	Harmonia Mundi France	1993	Period
J. S. Bach: Ascension Cantatas	John Eliot Gardiner Monteverdi Choir English Baroque Soloists	Nancy Argenta; Michael Chance; Anthony Rolfe Johnson; Stephen Varcoe	Archiv Produktion	1993	Period
Bach Edition Vol. 19 – Cantatas Vol. 10	Pieter Jan Leusink Holland Boys Choir Netherlands Bach Collegium	Ruth Holton; Sytse Buwalda; Nico van der Meel; Bas Ramselaar	Brilliant Classics	2000	Period
J. S. Bach: Complete Cantatas Vol. 16	Ton Koopman Amsterdam Baroque Orchestra & Choir	Johannette Zomer; Bogna Bartosz; Christoph Prégardien; Klaus Mertens	Antoine Marchand	2002	Period
J. S. Bach: Cantatas Vol. 44	Masaaki Suzuki Bach Collegium Japan	Rachel Nicholls; Robin Blaze; Gerd Türk; Peter Kooy	BIS	2008	Period
Johann Sebastian Bach (1685-1750) The Bach Cantata Pilgrimage Volume 28: Cantatas for Ascension Day	John Eliot Gardiner Monteverdi Choir English Baroque Soloists	Leneke Ruiten; Meg Bragle; Andrew Tortise; Dietrich Henschel	Soli Deo Gloria	2012	Period
J. S. Bach: Kantate 43 "Gott fähret auf mit Jauchzen""	Rudolf Lutz Vocal ensemble of Schola Seconda Pratica Schola Seconda Pratica	Miriam Feuersinger; Annekathrin Laabs; Charles Daniels; Wolf-Matthias Friedrich	Gallus Media	2019	Period
