= Grover Cleveland Alexander =

American baseball player (1887–1950)

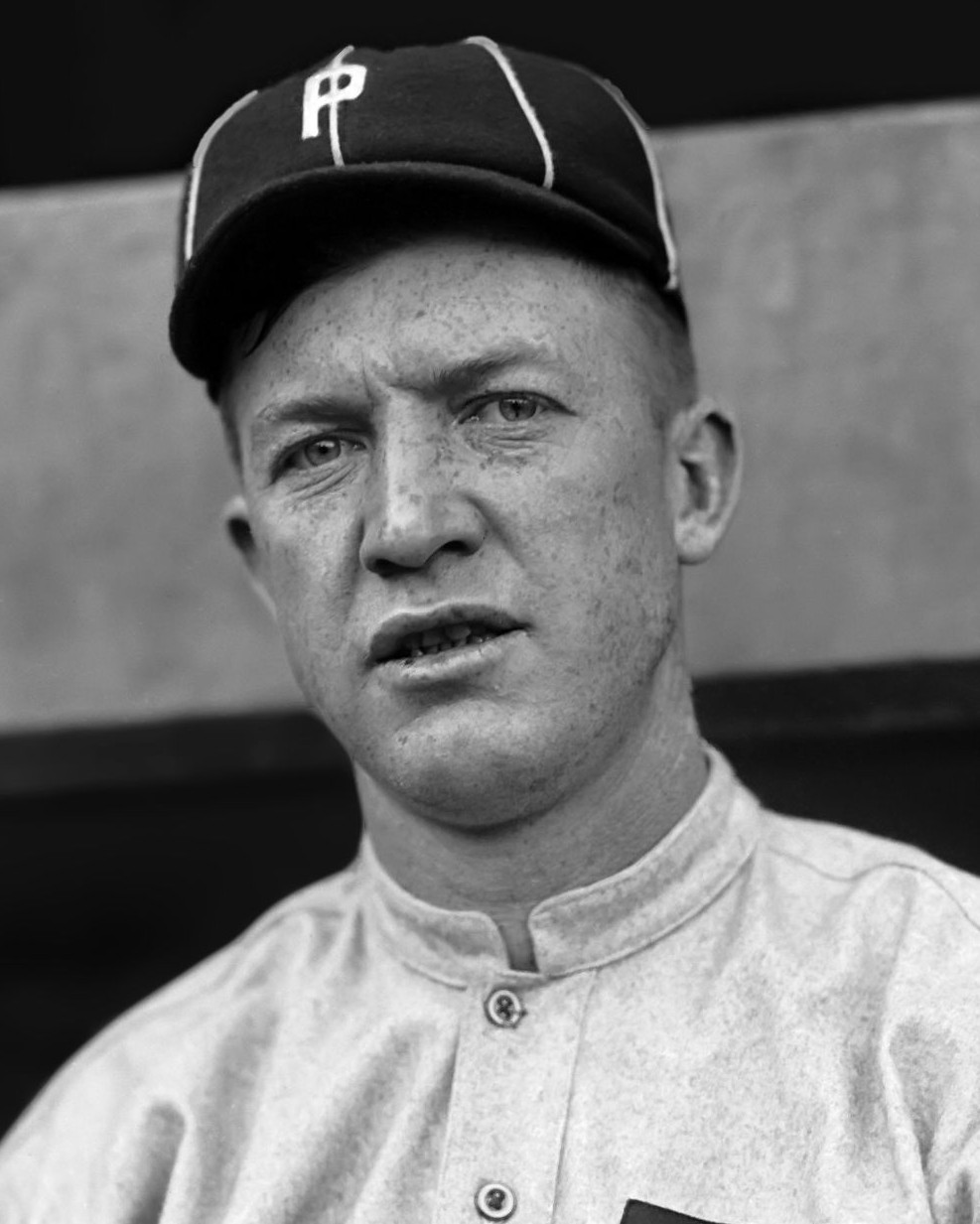
- Alexander in 1915
- Pitcher
- Born: February 26, 1887; Elba, Nebraska, U.S.
- Died: November 4, 1950 (aged 63); St. Paul, Nebraska, U.S.
- Batted: Right Threw: Right

MLB debut
- April 15, 1911, for the Philadelphia Phillies

Last MLB appearance
- May 28, 1930, for the Philadelphia Phillies

MLB statistics
- Win–loss record: 373–208
- Earned run average: 2.56
- Strikeouts: 2,198
- Stats at Baseball Reference

Teams
- Philadelphia Phillies (1911–1917); Chicago Cubs (1918–1926); St. Louis Cardinals (1926–1929); Philadelphia Phillies (1930)

Career highlights and awards
- World Series champion (1926); 3× Triple Crown (1915, 1916, 1920); 6× NL wins leader (1911, 1914–1917, 1920); 4× NL ERA leader (1915, 1916, 1919, 1920); 6× NL strikeout leader (1912, 1914–1917, 1920); Philadelphia Phillies jersey retired; Philadelphia Phillies Wall of Fame; Chicago Cubs Hall of Fame

Member of the National

Baseball Hall of Fame
- Induction: 1938
- Vote: 80.9% (third ballot)

Grover Cleveland Alexander (February 26, 1887 – November 4, 1950), nicknamed "Old Pete" and "Alexander the Great", was an American professional baseball pitcher in Major League Baseball. He played from 1911 through 1930 for the Philadelphia Phillies, Chicago Cubs, and St. Louis Cardinals. In 1938, Alexander was elected into the Baseball Hall of Fame.

== Early life ==
Alexander was born in Elba, Nebraska, one of eight children born to William Alexander and Martha "Maggie" Cootey. His father was a Democrat, and Alexander was born during the first term of President Grover Cleveland, a Democrat, so his parents named him for Cleveland. Alexander attended the schools of Elba and St. Paul, and graduated from St. Paul High School in 1909. After completing his education, Alexander was employed digging postholes for the Howard County Telephone Company.

Alexander played semi-professional baseball in his youth, signing his first professional contract at age 20 in 1907 for $50 per month ($1,728 in current dollar terms). In 1909, he played for the Galesburg Boosters in the Class D Illinois–Missouri League and went 15–8 that year with a 1.36 ERA. His career was almost ended when he was struck by a thrown ball while baserunning. Although this ended his 1909 season, he recovered by 1910 to become a star pitcher again, finishing with a 29–11 record for the Syracuse Stars in the Class B New York State League, before being sold to the Philadelphia Phillies for $750 ($25,915 in current dollar terms). He had been recommended to the Phillies by future scout Patsy O'Rourke, who would be rewarded by the team with a $100 bonus and two tickets to the 1915 World Series.

== Major League Baseball career ==
=== Philadelphia Phillies ===
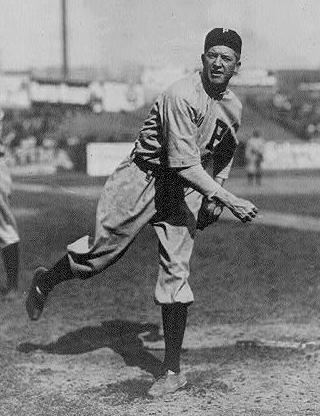
Alexander with the Philadelphia Phillies in 1915

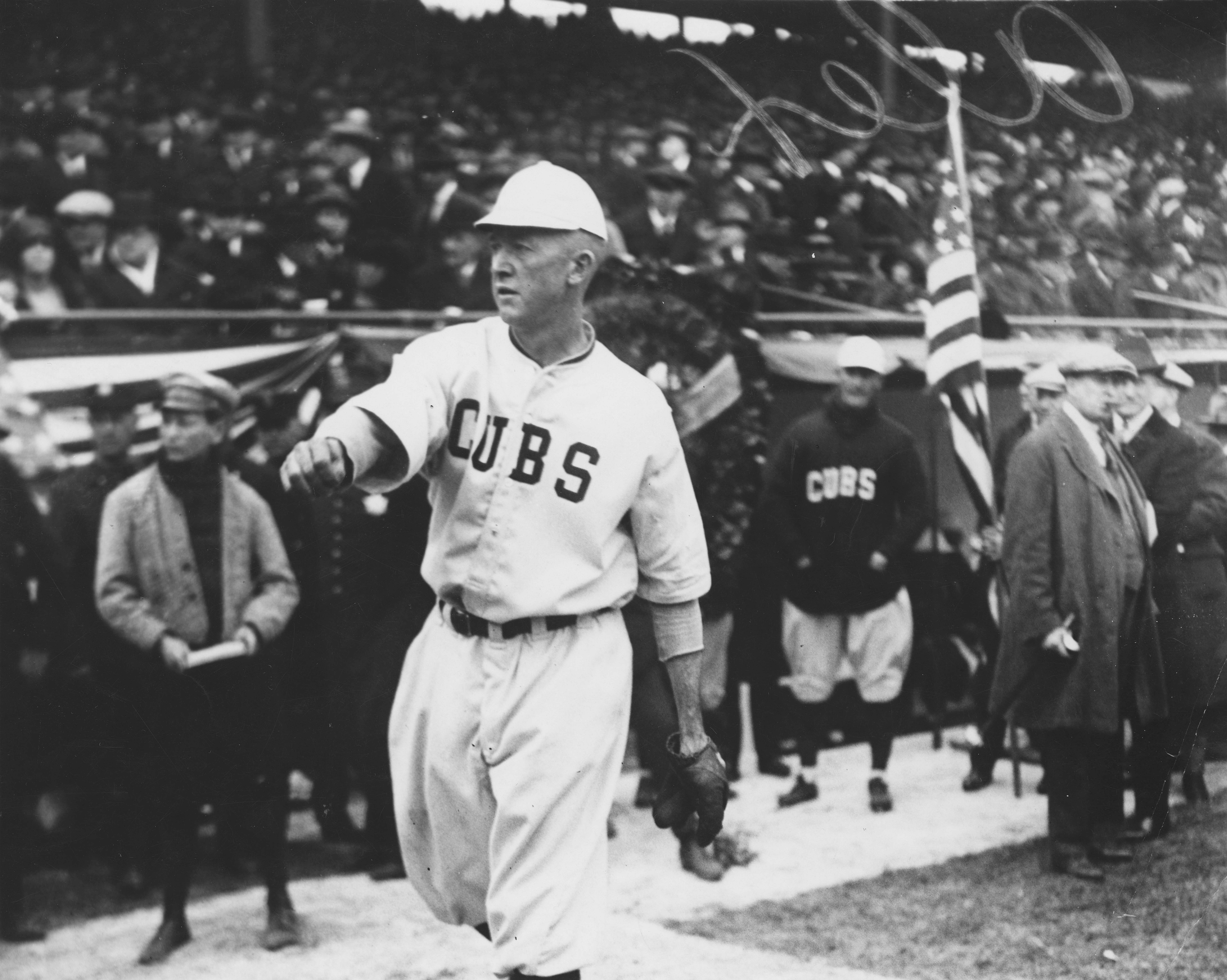
Alexander with the Chicago Cubs in 1921

Alexander made his Philadelphia Phillies debut during the pre-season on March 11, 1911 in a 3-4 loss to the Birmingham Barons at Rickwood Field. On April 6, 1911, Alexander no-hit the Athletics for five innings at Shibe Park in the City Series. He made his official Major League debut on April 15. He was joined on the Phillies that year by catcher Bill Killefer, who went on to become Alexander's favorite battery mate, catching 250 of his games.

In his rookie year, Alexander led the league with 28 wins (a modern-day rookie record), 31 complete games, 367 innings pitched, and seven shutouts, while finishing second in strikeouts and fourth in ERA. From 1912 to 1921, Alexander led the league in ERA four times (1915–16, 1919, and 1920), wins five times (1914–17, 1920), innings six times (1912, 1914–17, 1920), strikeouts six times (1912, 1914–1917, 1920), complete games five times (1914–1917, 1920), and shutouts five times (1915, 1916 [a single-season record 16], 1917, 1919, 1921). He won the National League pitching Triple Crown in 1915, 1916, and 1920, and is sometimes credited with a fourth in 1917. In 1915, he was instrumental in leading the Phillies to their first pennant, pitching a record five one-hitters and winning his only Major League triple crown. Along the way, Alexander began to have problems with alcohol, a struggle that would plague him the rest of his life. In 1915, he won his first World Series game (the opening game of that series), for the Phillies. It would be 65 years before the Phillies won another World Series game.

=== Chicago Cubs ===
After the 1917 season, the Phillies traded Alexander and catcher Bill Killefer to the Cubs for catcher Pickles Dillhoefer, pitcher Mike Prendergast, and $55,000. Phillies owner William Baker later admitted, "I needed the money."

After the United States entered World War I, Alexander was drafted into the Army, and one month before shipping out, he married Aimee Marie Arrant on May 31 in a courthouse ceremony in Manhattan, Kansas (the couple divorced in 1929, remarried in 1931, and divorced again in 1941).

Alexander spent most of the 1918 season in France as a sergeant with the 342nd Field Artillery Regiment, 89th Division. While he was serving in France, he was exposed to German mustard gas and a shell exploded near him, causing partial hearing loss and triggering the onset of epilepsy. Alexander returned to the United States in April 1919 on the SS Rochambeau. Following his return from the war, Alexander suffered from shell shock and was plagued with epileptic seizures, which people often misinterpreted as a sign of drunkenness; this only exacerbated his drinking problem.

=== St. Louis Cardinals ===
In spite of all this, Alexander gave Chicago several successful years and won another pitching triple crown in 1920. Tiring of his increasing drunkenness and insubordination that was often directly related to his epilepsy, the Cubs sold him to the Cardinals in the middle of the 1926 season for the waiver price. The Cubs manager, Joe McCarthy, supposedly said that even with Alexander, the Cubs had finished last the previous season, "...and if they finished last again, I'd rather it was without him."

The Cardinals won the National League pennant that year and met the New York Yankees in the World Series, where Alexander pitched complete game victories in Games 2 and 6. According to teammate Bob O'Farrell in The Glory of Their Times, after the game six victory, Alexander got drunk that night and was still feeling the effects when he was sent out to pitch the next day in Game 7. Alexander came into the game in the seventh inning after starter Jesse Haines developed a blister, with the Cardinals ahead 3–2, the bases loaded and two out. Facing Yankee slugger Tony Lazzeri, Alexander struck him out and then held the Yankees scoreless for two more innings to preserve the win and give St. Louis the championship. The final out of the 7th game was made when Babe Ruth tried to steal second base.

=== Return to Phillies ===
He had one last 20-win season for the Cardinals in 1927, but his continued drinking brought his career to a close. After a brief return to the Phillies in 1930, he left the major leagues.

Alexander's 90 shutouts are a National League record and his 373 wins are tied with Christy Mathewson for first in the National League record book. He is also tied for third all time in wins, tenth in innings pitched (5190), second in shutouts, and eighth in hits allowed (4868). At the time of Alexander's final victory in August 1929, the news media reported that he had broken Mathewson's career victories record of 372. In the 1940s, Mathewson was discovered to have qualified for an additional victory (May 21, 1912) and his total was officially upped to 373 and into a tie with Alexander. Alexander posted a lifetime winning percentage of .642, compared to Mathewson's .665. Alexander has the most career wins of any pitcher who never threw a no-hitter.

Alexander was a good fielding pitcher for his era, committing only 25 errors in 1,633 total chances for a career .985 fielding percentage. As a hitter, he accumulated 378 hits in 1,810 at-bats for a .209 batting average with 11 home runs, 163 runs batted in, 154 runs and 77 bases on balls in a 20-year career. He recorded 10 or more RBIs in a season nine times.

== Later life and legacy ==
Grover Cleveland Alexander was honored alongside the retired numbers of the Philadelphia Phillies in 2001.

During the late 1930s and early 1940s, Alexander continued to play baseball, touring as a player-coach for the Grover Cleveland Alexander's House of David Team. The team's tour was managed by J. L. Wilkinson and often played against the Kansas City Monarchs. Alexander played with and against many of the Negro league stars of the day, including Satchel Paige, John Donaldson, Newt Joseph, Chet Brewer, and Andy Cooper.

Playing with the House of David baseball team, Alexander would return to Philadelphia and the Phillies' National League Park on July 25, 1932 in a game against a team of Philadelphia All-Stars and was cheered warmly when he came to bat.

After the end of prohibition, Alexander operated a tavern in St. Louis with Hughie Miller as his partner.

Alexander was elected to Baseball's Hall of Fame in 1938, the third year of the Hall. Alexander was the only player elected that year.

In 1939, during the Great Depression, Alexander was lecturing in New York at a Gotham Flea Circus according to a news article.

Alexander attended Game 3 of the 1950 World Series at Yankee Stadium, where he saw the Phillies lose to the Yankees. He died less than a month later, on November 4 in St. Paul, Nebraska, at the age of 63. He is buried in Elmwood Cemetery in St Paul.

Alexander was the subject of the 1952 biographical film The Winning Team, portrayed by Ronald Reagan, giving Alexander the unique distinction of being named for one U.S. president and being portrayed by another. The film earned an estimated $1.7 million at the North American box office in 1952.

In 1999, he ranked number 12 on The Sporting News list of the 100 Greatest Baseball Players, and was a nominee for the Major League Baseball All-Century Team. Since he played before the Phillies adopted uniform numbers, the block-letter "P" from the 1915 season uniforms was retired by the team in 2001 to honor his career with them.

Alexander is the first player mentioned in the poem Line-Up for Yesterday by Ogden Nash:

Line-Up for Yesterday

A is for Alex
The great Alexander;
More Goose eggs he pitched
Than a popular gander.

— Ogden Nash, Sport magazine (January 1949)

== Nicknames ==
Newspapers often mentioned Alexander's full name when writing about him, in addition to just "Grover". He was also sometimes called "Alec", and on occasions when he succeeded in grand fashion (as with the 1926 World Series), they would call him "Alexander the Great". He was so dominant during the 1910s that many players and writers of his era referred to him as "the best pitcher to ever put on a pair of shoes".

The nickname of "Old Pete" began as "Alkali Pete", which was in itself a pastiche, based on a series of early silent film westerns based on characters named Alkali Ike and Mustang Pete. While on a hunting trip with Bill Killefer in Texas, Alexander's dusty appearance prompted Killefer to name him "Alkali Pete" and it stuck. Before going to war, he was given a watch engraved with the nickname, dating its origin to no later than 1918. By the late 1920s, it had morphed into "Old Pete."

It is uncertain how frequently Alexander was publicly called by that nickname during his playing days. When he won his 373rd game on August 10, 1929, one newspaper had called him "old Pete", indicating that the nickname was in public circulation. On his 1940 Playball baseball card he was referred to as "Ol' Pete." In The World Series and Highlights of Baseball, by Lamont Buchanan, published in 1951, the year after Alexander died, on pages 106–107 the author refers to "Pete Alexander" and "Ol' Pete" in a matter-of-fact way, suggesting the nickname was well known.

The Baseball-Reference.com website lists him as Grover Alexander with a name note and an AKA as Pete Alexander.

His nickname among family friends in Nebraska was "Dode".

== See also ==
- Major League Baseball titles leaders
- Major League Baseball Triple Crown
- List of Major League Baseball annual ERA leaders
- List of Major League Baseball annual strikeout leaders
- List of Major League Baseball annual wins leaders
- List of Major League Baseball career ERA leaders
- List of Major League Baseball career FIP leaders
- List of Major League Baseball career wins leaders
- List of Major League Baseball career strikeout leaders
