= Martyrs of the Alamo =

1915 film

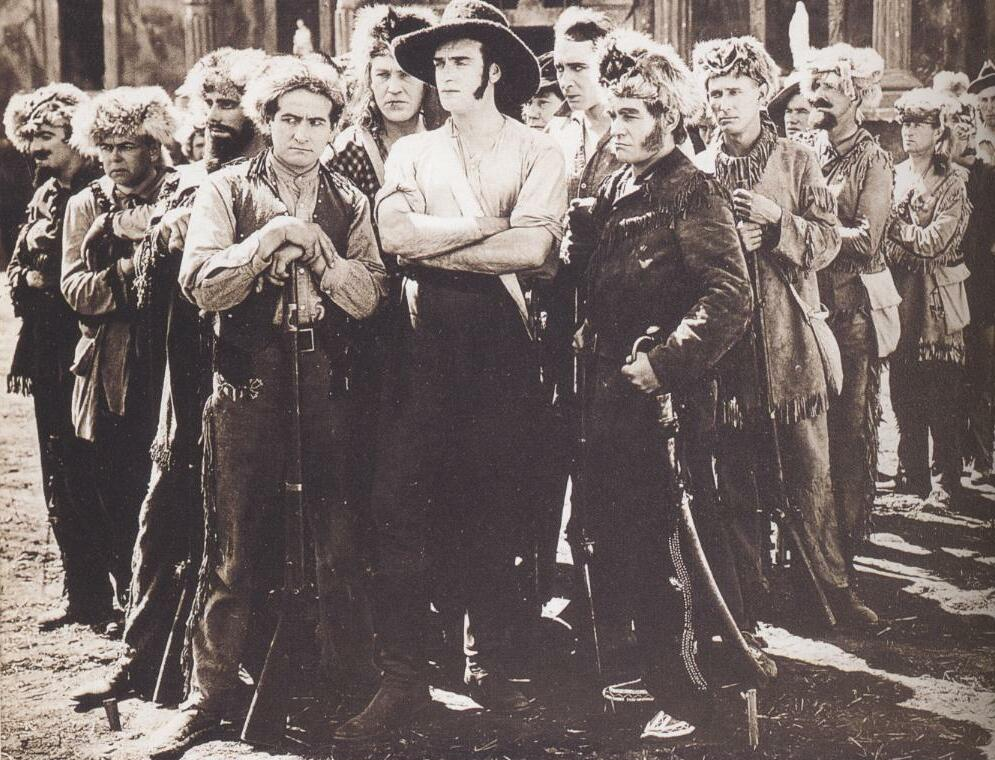
- Scene from the film
- Directed by: Christy Cabanne
- Written by: Christy Cabanne
- Based on: Martyrs of the Alamo by Theodosia Harris
- Produced by: D. W. Griffith
- Starring: Sam De Grasse; Douglas Fairbanks; Walter Long; Alfred Paget
- Cinematography: William Fildew
- Music by: Michael Boldt
- Distributed by: Triangle Film Corporation
- Release date: November 21, 1915
- Running time: 70 minutes
- Country: United States
- Languages: Silent; English intertitles

Martyrs of the Alamo (also known as The Birth of Texas) is a 1915 American historical war drama film written and directed by Christy Cabanne. The film is based on the historical novel of the same name by Theodosia Harris, and features an ensemble cast including Sam De Grasse, Douglas Fairbanks, Walter Long and Alfred Paget. Fairbanks role was uncredited, and was his first role in film, although his first starring role, in The Lamb, was released prior to this picture. The film features the siege of Béxar, the Battle of the Alamo, and the Battle of San Jacinto.

While making claims to historical accuracy, the film depicts the Mexican population in San Antonio in 1836 as a group of ill-mannered drunks. One scene depicts a Mexican officer verbally assaulting a white woman and making advances on her. The white woman reports the incident to her husband, Almeron Dickinson, who in turn shoots the Mexican officer. In his book Remembering the Alamo, author Richard R. Flores, argues that the negative portrayal of the Mexican population is due to racism toward Mexicans in 1915, the year the film was produced. A copy of the film is preserved at the Library of Congress.

== Cast ==
- Sam De Grasse as Silent Smith (Deaf Smith)
- Allan Sears as David Crockett
- Walter Long as Santa Anna
- Alfred Paget as James Bowie
- Fred Burns as Almeron Dickinson
- John T. Dillon as Colonel Travis
- Douglas Fairbanks as Joe/Texan Soldier
- Juanita Hansen as Old Soldier's Daughter
- Ora Carew as Mrs. Dickinson
- Tom Wilson as Sam Houston
- Augustus Carney as Old Soldier
