= Rector (surname) =

Rector is a surname. Notable people with the surname include:

- Ab Rector (1934–2005), Canadian politician
- Alan Rector, professor of medical informatics
- Anne Elizabeth Rector (1899–1970), American artist and author
- Chris Rector (b. 1951), American Politician
- Eddie Rector (1890–1962), African American tap dancer of the Vaudeville era
- Edward F. Rector (1916–2001), United States Air Force
- Elias W. Rector (1849–1917), American politician
- Enoch J. Rector (1863–1957), American boxing film promoter
- Floyd Rector, nephrologist and emeritus professor of medicine
- George Rector (1870s–1947), restaurateur and raconteur
- Giovanni Rector (b. 1982), South African association football player
- Hartman Rector Jr. (1924–2018), American Latter Day Saints leader
- Henry Massey Rector (1816–1899), governor of Arkansas
- Jamaica Rector (b. 1981), American football player
- James Rector (1884–1949), athlete
- James Rector (student), "Bloody Thursday" victim
- James Ward Rector (1903–1979), American jurist
- Jeff Rector (born 1958), American actor
- Joe A. Rector (1935–2012), American/Cherokee artist
- Josephine Rector (1885–1958), American scriptwriter and actress
- Liam Rector (1949–2007), American poet
- Michael Rector (born 1993), American football wide receiver
- Ricky Ray Rector (1950–1992), executed murderer
- Robert Rector, American author
- Ron Rector (1944–1968), American football player
- Sarah Rector (1902–1967), Member of the Muscogee (Creek) Nation, best known for being the "Richest Colored Girl in the world" or the "Millionaire girl a member of the race"
- Tracy Rector (born 1972), American filmmaker, curator, and arts advocate
