= The Ghost House (film) =

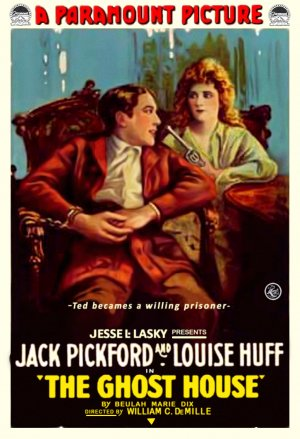
- Theatrical release poster
- Directed by: William C. deMille
- Screenplay by: Beulah Marie Dix
- Produced by: Jesse L. Lasky
- Starring: Jack Pickford; Louise Huff; Olga Grey; James Neill; Eugene Pallette; Horace B. Carpenter
- Cinematography: Paul P. Perry; Joseph Shelderfer
- Production company: Jesse L. Lasky Feature Play Company
- Distributed by: Paramount Pictures
- Release date: October 1, 1917
- Running time: 50 minutes
- Country: United States
- Language: Silent (English intertitles)

The Ghost House is a 1917 American silent comedy film directed by William C. deMille and written by Beulah Marie Dix. The film stars Jack Pickford, Louise Huff, Olga Grey, James Neill, Eugene Pallette, and Horace B. Carpenter. The film was released on October 1, 1917, by Paramount Pictures. It is not known whether the film currently survives, which suggests that it is a lost film.

== Plot ==
As described in a film magazine, Lois Atwell and her widowed sister Alice, with no money left to pay their rent, go to live in a house left to them by their uncle which is known to be haunted. The same evening Ted Rawson is sent to spend the night in the haunted house as part of his college hazing. When the women hear someone breaking into the house they think he is a burglar and Lois holds Ted captive at the point of a gun. A real thief is also hiding in the house and when he sees the women trailing in their white gowns, he thinks they are ghosts and departs hastily. Although Lois doubts that Ted is a real housebreaker, she treats him as one until he can explain who he is and the police catch the actual criminal.

== Cast ==
- Jack Pickford as Ted Rawson
- Louise Huff as Lois Atwell
- Olga Grey as Alice Atwell
- James Neill as Jeremy Foster
- Eugene Pallette as Spud Foster
- Horace B. Carpenter as James Clancy
- Mrs. Lewis McCord as Dido
- Edythe Chapman as Mrs. Rawson
- Lillian Leighton as Mary Ellen Clancy
