= Urban Gottfried Sieber =

German Lutheran theologian (1669–1741)

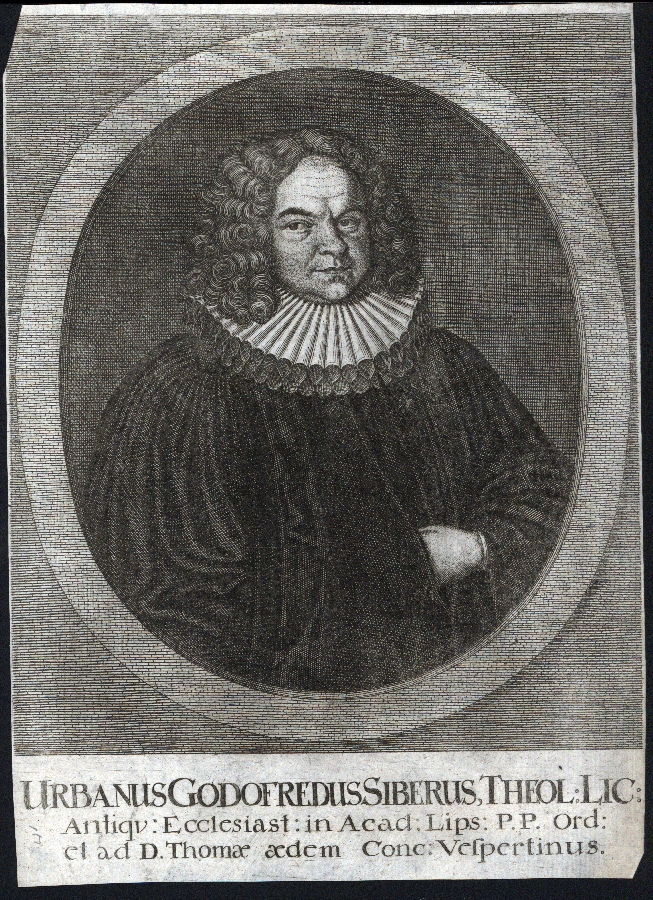
- Born: 12 December 1669; Schandau, Saxony
- Died: 15 June 1741 (aged 71); Leipzig, Saxony
- Other name: Urban Gottfried Siber
- Education: University of Wittenberg
- Occupations: Theologian; Academic teacher
- Organizations: Thomaskirche; University of Wittenberg

Urban Gottfried Sieber, also Siber, (12 December 1669 – 15 June 1741) was a German Lutheran theologian who worked at the Thomaskirche in Leipzig during Bach's time as Thomaskantor, and as professor of church history at the Leipzig University.

== Life and career ==
Sieber was born in Schandau, the son of the pastor Justus Sieber and his wife Catharina Zinck; he had many siblings. He was first educated by a private teacher and then attended the Meißen Ducal state school from age 13. He studied at the University of Wittenberg from 1688 for three years, with Konrad Samuel Schurzfleisch, Christian Donati, Christian Röhrensee, Michael Walther, Caspar Löscher, Johann Deutschmann, Johann Georg Neumann and Philipp Ludwig Hanneken. He continued his studies from 1691 in Hamburg with Esdras Edzardus, especially in Hebrew and Latin, and at the University of Kiel with Christian Kortholt, Christoph Franck, Martin Opitz, Johann Burchard May and Heinrich Muhlius. He then moved to Copenhagen where he took a teaching position as Hofmeister.

He returned to Saxony in 1695, because his father died. He achieved a magister degree in philosophy in Wittenberg on 22 April 1696. He became rector of a Latin school in Schneeberg in 1698, where he was made deacon in 1703 archdeacon in 1708. In 1711 he moved to the Thomaskirche in Leipzig where he was first deacon and Mittagsprediger, and then served from 1714 as preacher in vespers, from 1730 as archdeacon and from 1739 as pastor.

In 1714, Sieber obtained a licentiate degree, and from 1715, he held a new chair of church history ("Kirchen-Altertümer") at Leipzig University. He achieved a doctorate in theology in 1734.

Sieber was not married. He died in Leipzig on 15 June 1741, at the age of 71.

== Works ==
Sieber's works include:

- De Anancaeo ad Plauti Rudent. Act. II, Scen. II Moly hermetis herbam ... 1699 (online at the Internet Archive)
- De Statua Memnonis falso credita ad Tacit. Annal. lib. II, c. 61. 1699
- De Ducenariis. 1698
- De vicissitudinibus libertatis et servitutis Britannicae. 1698
- De laude civitatis et consulum Schneebergensium. 1702
- De Jubileo Tertio Academiae Lipsiensis. 1709
- De illustribus Alemannis, imprimis iis quos Magdeburgum ob nobilitatem gentis ... ad se recepit atque diffudit. Leipzig 1710
- Historia Godeschalcorum. 1712
- De templorum antiquitatibus. (dissertation) Wittenberg 1696
- Templorum condendorum ac dedicandorum ritus. 1716
- Canes e templis exterminandum juxta leges ecclesiasticas. Leipzig 1712
- De velo virginum sacrum. 1708
- De matrimonio iterate. 1712
- De Albatis. 1713
- De antiquitate doctoratus theologici. 1734
- Enchiridion Sixti II., Pontificis et Martyris ut Christianum saec. III.
- Monumentum. 1725
- Telesphori, pontificis Romani vita ab erroribus purgat.1714
- De B. Chrysostomo.
- De Caesareae Palaestinae Episcopis. 1734
- S. Spyridionis ep. Trinithuntini vitam eiusque in Turcas a Corcyrensi obsidione profligato fortitudinem examinat. 1718
- De sanctis columnaribus. 1714
- Historia melodorum ecclesiae Librisque Liturgicis. 1714
- Martyrologium Ecclesiae Graecae metricum ex Menaeis, Codice Chrifletiano, Actisque Sanctorum primum collectum, interpretatum et illusatrtum. 1727
- De Gaza Palaestinae oppido. 1715
- De σκληροκαρδἰᾳ s. de duritia mentis.
- De velo virginum sacrarum.
- Qualis imperantibus expediat uxor. 1712
