= The Absentee (1915 film) =

1915 American silent allegory film, directed by Christy Cabanne

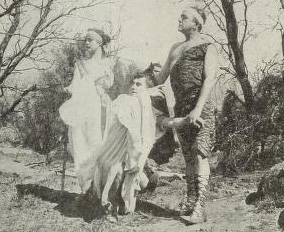
- The characters (left to right): Justice, Might, and Success
- Directed by: Christy Cabanne
- Written by: Christy Cabanne; Frank E. Woods
- Produced by: Christy Cabanne
- Starring: Robert Edeson; A. D. Sears; Olga Grey
- Cinematography: William E. Fildew
- Production company: Majestic Motion Picture
- Distributed by: Mutual Film Corp.
- Release date: May 8, 1915 (US)
- Running time: 5 reels
- Country: United States
- Language: English

The Absentee is a lost 1915 American silent allegory film directed by Christy Cabanne and starring Robert Edeson, A. D. Sears, and Olga Grey. It was released on May 8, 1915.

== Plot ==
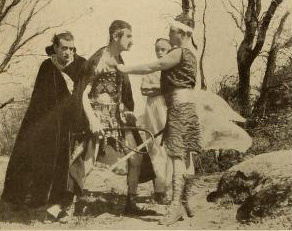
Success admonishing Might, with Evil (left) and Justice (background)

In a prologue, the mythical figure of Ambition seeks to attain the position currently held by Success. Success has reached the pinnacle of his desire, and sits looking over his kingdom. Having achieved his success, Success decides to take a break and goes off with Pleasure, leaving Might in control of the land. Might, under the influence of Evil, along with Might's wife Extravagance, as well as by his daughter Vanity, begins to abuse the land's occupants, including Toil, Age, Strength, Innocence, Happiness, and Ambition. Spurred on by Evil, who says that Justice is blind and cannot see what he is doing, Might whips the laborers. However, Justice is not blind, and she learns of the situation, informing Success, who returns and sets the situation right again.

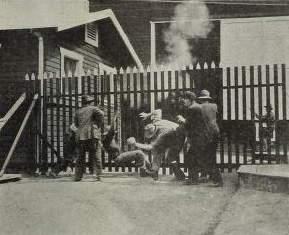
The first riot

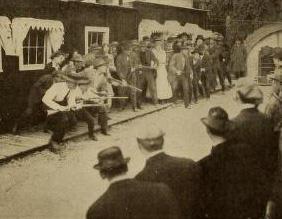
The final confrontation

In current time, Nathaniel Crosby (who is the embodiment of Success in the prologue) is the sole owner of a prosperous factory. After receiving a letter from his general manager telling him that he needs to take a vacation, and can trust him to take care of things while he is away, he decides to take a holiday. Leaving his general manager, Sampson Rhodes (the personification of Might) in charge, he starts out on an extended pleasure trip. Rhodes is influenced by his wife (the personification of Extravagance) and Genevieve, his daughter (the personification of Vanity), to take advantage of his position to increase their wealth and social position. Rhodes lowers the workers' wages, so he can take a bigger cut of the profits. The workers retaliate by going on strike, and the police are called in to protect the plant. Tom Burke (the embodiment of Ambition) can no longer financially support his ill mother since he is striking. Neither can he go through with plans to marry David Lee's (the embodiment of Contentment), the foreman's, older daughter Happiness. Lee, along with several other laborers, become more and more discontent as the strike continues, and they eventually turn the strike into a riot. In the first assault several of the workers, as well as one of the policemen, are killed.

As the violence continues to escalate, Rhodes realizes that it has gone beyond the abilities of the police to handle, and calls in the militia to put down the riot. However, Rhodes secretary, Ruth Farwell (the embodiment of Justice), tracks down Crosby and tells him of the situation. When he is reticent to return, telling her that Rhodes can handle the situation, she explodes at him, letting him know that over a dozen have been killed in the riots and that their blood will be on his head. She then runs from the room, dropping one of her gloves. Rhodes returns to the plant in order to defuse the situation, but when Ruth recognizes him as he approaches the factory, the rioters turn their ire on him, beginning to beat him. Ruth, along with Burke, manage to get him away from the crowd and into a nearby boarding house.

Recovering from his daze, he asks Ruth what is happening, she simply points out the window, where they can see the mob approaching the militia, which is standing in a line, weapons at the ready. They have been given the authority by Rhodes to fire on the crowd if necessary to protect the factory. Crosby rushes out of the room, followed by Ruth. In the ruckus which follows, Ruth is shot when she steps in front of a bullet meant for Crosby, fired by Lee. Crosby ends the riot by telling them men to come back to work at their prior wages, which is what they wanted. The militia is dismissed, and Crosby fires Rhodes.

With the plant returned to its former status, Crosby goes to visit Ruth in the hospital, where she has been convalescing. She assures him that she can return to work soon, telling him that she's been practicing her shorthand, showing him her pad and pencil. He asks her to take a letter for him, thanking someone for opening his eyes, and asking her to marry him. When Ruth asks him to whom she should address the letter, he takes out the glove she left behind when she came to tell him of the riots, and says simply, "To the owner of this glove".

== Cast list ==
- Arthur Paget as Evil
- Charles Lee as Age
- Otto Lincoln as Toil
- Robert Edeson as Nathaniel Crosby, the Absentee/Success
- A. D. Sears as Sampson Rhodes/Might
- George Andre Beranger as Tom Burke/Ambition
- Augustus Carney as David Lee/Contentment
- Loretta Blake as Happiness
- Mildred Harris as Innocence
- Wahnetta Hanson as Genevieve Rhodes/Vanity
- Olga Grey as Ruth Farwell/Justice

== Production ==
In early April 1915 it was announced that Cabanne was working on allegorical film titled The Absentee which he also co-wrote with Frank E. Woods. At one point during filming, Robert Edeson forgot that he was acting and broke up a mob during filming. However, the script had called for the mob to turn him back, so the scene had to be re-shot. Cabanne had completed filming by April 1915. On May 1, it was announced that the film would be released that week, on May 3.

== Reception ==
Variety gave the film a lukewarm review. They lauded Cabanne's direction as well as the script and plot, especially the mob scenes. However, they felt the movie was too slow, stating "... the film lags until the final reel." The Saturday Evening Post gave the film a positive review, saying "It gives you a mental Turkish bath, then rubs your conscience down with a rough towel. It's a great picture to see. Full of very beautiful scenes —– interspersed with some that have prongs in them." Motion Picture News gave the picture an overall favorable review, although they felt the epilogue in which all the resolutions are shown was too long. They particularly enjoyed the allegorical prologue, then projected into the main story: "Yet this knowledge furnished to the onlooker is by no means a dampener to his interest. It is most attractive to watch the development of the main plot after seeing the same characters in the allegorical prologue. It is fascinating to see the similarity of the abstract and the specific, as conceived by the authors and to note the truth of both versions of the themes." Motography gave the film a positive review, being particularly impressed with the cinematography. Moving Picture World also gave the film a positive review, enjoying the symbolism employed by the allegory, although they did voice displeasure in the decision to have Evil as a real person, instead of simply a presence. They praised the teamwork of Woods and Cabanne, and gave good reviews to the entire cast, highlighting the work of Edeson and Gray.

== Preservation ==
With no holdings located in archives, The Absentee is considered a lost film.

== Notes ==
At least one source, Picture-Play Weekly, had notes of different character names. They have John Marxham instead of Nathaniel Crosby; Alma Ward instead of Ruth Farwell; Robert Thornley instead of Sampson Rhodes; and Tom Carrol instead of David Lee.
