= Olga Grey =

American actress

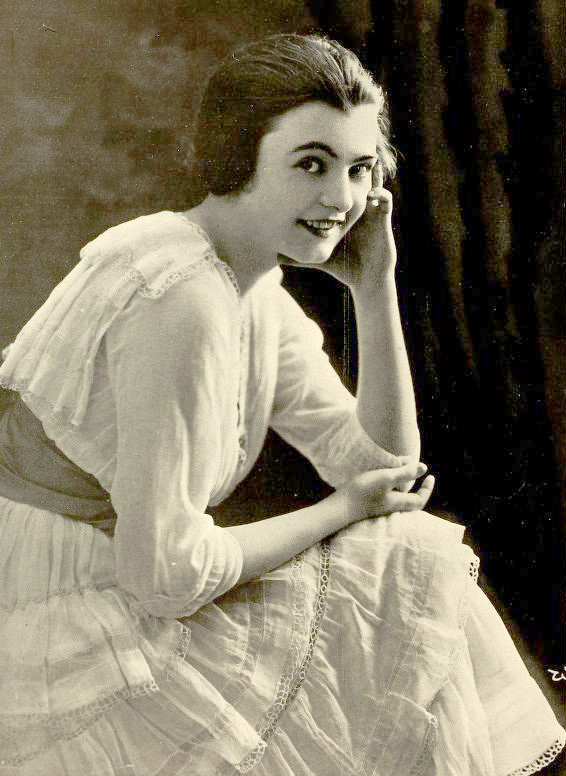
- From The Photo-Play Journal, 1916.
- Born: Anushka Zacsek; November 10, 1896; New York City, New York, U.S.
- Died: April 25, 1973 (aged 76); Los Angeles, California, U.S.
- Other name: Olga Gray
- Occupation: Actress
- Years active: 1915–1920

Olga Grey (born Anushka Zacsek or Anna Zacsek, November 10, 1896 – April 25, 1973) was an American silent film actress, sometimes billed with the alternate spelling of her last name, Olga Gray.

She was born in New York City to Hungarian immigrants. Her father wanted her to become a violinist, so she studied music while harboring dreams of being an actress. She appeared in some amateur productions before joining a Little Theatre in Los Angeles. Her success there paved the way for her work in films.

By her late teens, she was pursuing an acting career in Hollywood. She began working as an extra. Her first film appearance was in the 1915 film His Lesson, in which she had the lead role. She would have twelve film roles that year, including a role (as the actress Laura Keene) in the now classic and controversial film The Birth of a Nation, starring Lillian Gish, Mae Marsh, and directed by D. W. Griffith.

In 1916 she appeared in seven films, including the role of "Lady Agnes" in Macbeth. She would have another eleven roles between 1917 and 1920, with a steady decline of quality roles.

In 1920 she married film actor Arnold Gregg (real name: Arnold Ray Samberg). She later became an attorney under her original name, Anna Zacsek, passing the California bar in 1932. In 1942 she was one of the defense attorneys in the "Sleepy Lagoon" trials, defending gang members Henry Leyvas, Victor Segobia, and Edward Grandpré. She was the only woman attorney in the courtroom for these trials.

Anna Zacsek was residing in Los Angeles at the time of her death on April 25, 1973, aged 76.

== Filmography ==
Year	Title	Role	Notes
1915	The Birth of a Nation	Laura Keene	Uncredited
1915	The Absentee	Ruth Farwell / Justice	Lost film
1915	The Failure	Rose	Lost film
1915	Double Trouble	Madame Leclaire	
1916	Macbeth	Lady Agnes	Lost film
1916	A Wild Girl of the Sierras	Moll	Lost film
1916	Pillars of Society	Madame Linda Dorf	Lost film
1916	Intolerance	Adultress	
1917	The Little Liar	Fanny	Lost film
1917	Jim Bludso	Gabrielle	Lost film
1917	Love's Law	Jealousy	Lost film
1917	The Girl at Home	Diana Parish	
1917	The Ghost House	Alice Atwell	Lost film
1917	The Woman God Forgot	Aztec woman	
1917	Fanatics	Lola Monroe	Lost film
1919	When a Man Rides Alone	Beatriz de Taos	Lost film
1919	The Modern Husband	Cleo	Lost film
1919	The Mayor of Filbert	Miss Greta Schwartz	Lost film
1919	Trixie from Broadway	Gertie Brown	Lost film
1920	The Third Eye	Zaida Savoy	Serial; Lost film
