= Alkali Ike's Auto =

1911 film

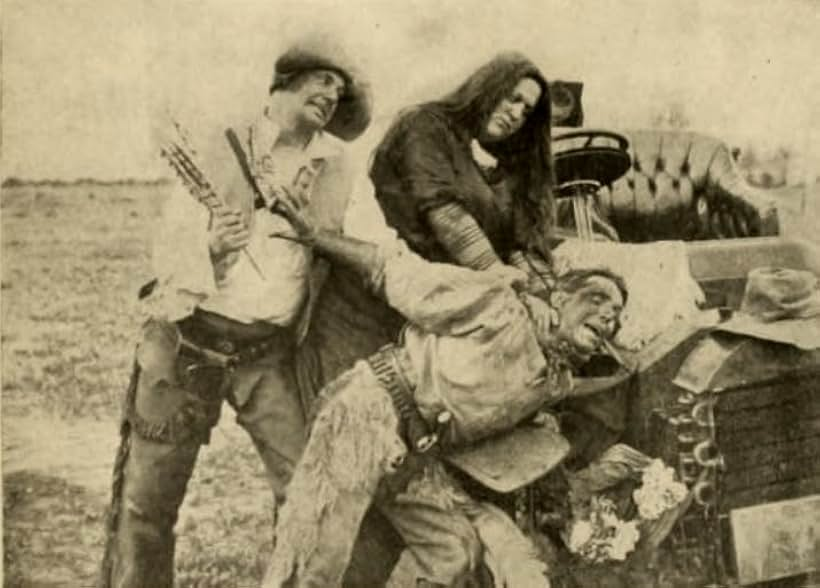
- Directed by: Gilbert M. 'Broncho Billy' Anderson
- Written by: Gilbert M. 'Broncho Billy' Anderson
- Produced by: Gilbert M. 'Broncho Billy' Anderson
- Starring: Augustus Carney; Harry Todd; Hakkı Necip Ağrıman
- Distributed by: General Film Company
- Release date: May 20, 1911
- Running time: 11 minutes
- Country: United States
- Language: Silent with English intertitles

Alkali Ike's Auto is a 1911 American silent short comedy film directed by Gilbert M. 'Broncho Billy' Anderson. The film is the first in the "Alkali Ike" series.

== Cast ==
- Augustus Carney as Alkali Ike
- Harry Todd as Mustang Pete
- Margaret Joslin as Betty Brown
- Arthur Mackley as Man in Apron
- Victor Potel
- John B. O'Brien
- Fred Church

== Preservation ==
Also preserved in the Library of Congress collection.

== See also ==
- List of American films of 1911
- 1911 in film
