= The Failure (1915 film) =

1915 silent film directed by Christy Cabanne

- Directed by: Christy Cabanne
- Written by: Christy Cabanne
- Starring: John Emerson; Wahnetta Hanson; A. D. Sears
- Cinematography: William E. Fildew
- Production company: Reliance Motion Pictures
- Distributed by: Mutual Film Corp.
- Release date: May 27, 1915 (US)
- Running time: 44 minutes
- Country: United States
- Language: English

The Failure is a 1915 silent American 4-reel drama film, directed by Christy Cabanne. It stars John Emerson, Wahnetta Hanson, and A. D. Sears, and was released on May 27, 1915.

== Plot ==
When his girlfriend, Ruth Shipman, is sexually harassed by theater producer Isaac Shuman, Tom Warder investigates the manager's behavior and publishes a blistering story exposing Shuman's predatory tactics. Shuman is forced to leave town, but promises revenging, leaving a note telling Tom that he "will kill him".

Years go by and Tom and Ruth are married and have a baby. Tom has written a play. Shuman finally sees a way to get his revenge. Returning to town, he pretends to befriend Tom and let bygones be bygones. He even expresses interest in producing Tom's play. However, Tom has already agreed to have another producer put his play on. Shuman steals the play and produces it, claiming it as his own. His accusations of theft by Tom work, and Tom is imprisoned.

Tom escapes from prison, but discovers that both Ruth and his child have died while he was in the penitentiary. He decides to get some vengeance of his own, and forces Shuman to agree to meet him in a bar. When they do, Tom takes poison, slips the vial into Shuman's pocket and accuses Shuman of poisoning him. When the police arrive, he provides the note Shuman had sent him all those years ago, proving Shuman's animus towards him. As Tom dies, the police assure him that Shuman will hang for his murder.

== Cast ==
- John Emerson as Tom Warder
- Wahnetta Hanson as Ruth Shipman
- Allan Sears as Isaac Shuman
- Olga Gray as Rose
- Augustus Carney

== Production ==
In April 1915 it was announced that Christy Cabanne would be directing the picture, based on his screenplay. It was the third Mutual Master-Picture, and starred John Emerson. During production thousands of extras were used. During a theater scene, Cabanne utilized over 1400, and in another scene portraying a parade, he used an addition 4000. In another scene in a bar, when he ran short of actors, Cabanne had his production manager, Frank E. Woods, round up actors, directors and other film personnel who were not busy at the moment. In the scene, he used such notables as Henry Walthall, Charles Clary, Jack Conway, Sam de Grasse, Ralph Lewis, Spottiswoode Aitken, and George Beranger.

== Reception ==
Motion Picture News gave the film a positive review, commending the performances of John Emerson and Olga Gray.

== In other media ==
The film was serialized in the June 26 issue of Picture-Play Weekly magazine.
