= Christ in the winepress =

Motif in Christian iconography

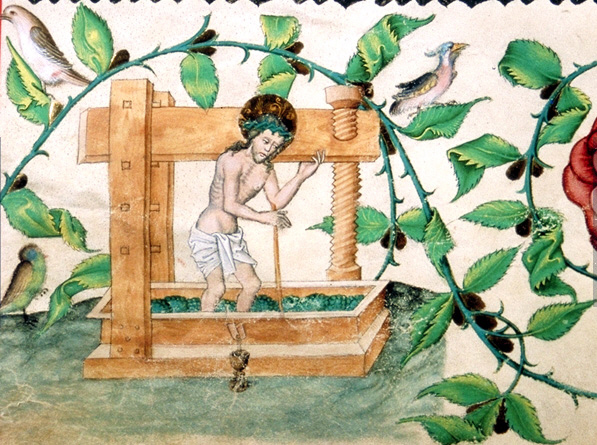
Christ in the Winepress, a rare example with green grapes for white wine, c. 1490

Christ in the winepress or the mystical winepress is a motif in Christian iconography showing Christ standing in a winepress, where Christ himself becomes the grapes in the press. It derives from the interpretation by Augustine and other early theologians of a group of passages in the Bible and is found as a visual image in Christian art between about 1100 and the 18th century, as well as in religious literature of many kinds. The image in art underwent a number of changes of emphasis, while remaining fairly consistent in its basic visual content, and was one of the relatively few medieval metaphorical or allegorical devotional images to maintain a foothold in Protestant iconography after the Reformation.

== Development of the image ==
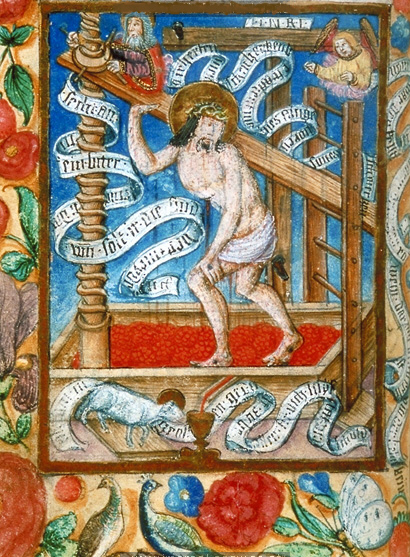
God the Father turning the press and the Lamb of God at the chalice. Prayer book of 1515–1520

The image was first used c. 1108 as a typological prefiguration of the crucifixion of Jesus and appears as a paired subordinate image for a Crucifixion, in a painted ceiling in the "small monastery" ("Klein-Comburg", as opposed to the main one) at Comburg. Here Isaiah stands just outside the winepress with a banderole; Christ stands erect, in front of the press's heavy beam, which is level with his waist. In another example, a miniature from Hildesheim c. 1160–80, there is no mechanical press and Christ just treads in a small vat which is, for once, circular. He is flanked by figures with banderoles, perhaps Isaiah and John the Evangelist. Christ's banderole has part of Isaiah 63:3, and those of the flanking figures Genesis 49:11 and Numbers 13:18. The monastic context of the Comburg example is typical of these early examples, and at this period only monasteries and wealthy lords were likely to have such expensive equipment as a large screw press; often they were made available to smaller growers for a share of the juice. The Comburg area in Baden-Württemberg continues to have vineyards as a major element of its agriculture.

From around 1400 the conception of the figure changed, and the Christ figure became a Man of Sorrows, with the weight of the press bearing down on him, often shown as a bent figure as in a depiction of Christ Carrying the Cross. He usually wears only a cloth round his waist, and blood from his wounds may be shown falling to join the grape juice in the treading-floor. In many examples the beam has a cross-member, spelling out the identification of beam and cross, or Christ carries a cross on his back under the beam. The image has become focused on the Eucharist and also part of the suite of late-medieval andachtsbilder imagery emphasizing the sufferings of Christ.

The "mystic winepress" was common in hymns and sermons of the late medieval period but rarer in the visual arts. Most examples are from north of the Alps, and representations in stained glass seem to have been popular. In England, where little wine was made, they were probably very rare. Examples include several French and Flemish tapestries, and stained glass windows including the "Vitrail du pressoir mystique" at the church of Saint-Étienne-du-Mont in Paris. This has Christ lying down beneath a cross with three screws fixed through its extremities; as in other examples he brings an arm up to pull the shaft down upon him. To the left of the main press Saint Peter treads in his own circular tub. Troyes Cathedral has a somewhat similar window from about 1625.

The Dutch Hours of Catherine of Cleves (currently housed at Morgan Library and Museum in New York City) has a bas-de-page image in a typological context, paired with a typically idiosyncratic main miniature of a standing Christ beside a cross resting diagonally on the ground. Another example is in a 15th-century book of hours in the Victoria and Albert Museum.

As a eucharistic image, it had a counterpart in the much rarer image, essentially restricted to German-speaking lands, of the Hostienmühle or "host-mill", where a grain mill turns out hosts for the Eucharist. In winepress images the juice now often flows into a chalice, though it may also flow into a bucket. Angels, farm-workers or sometimes a Lamb of God (apparently drinking it) may attend to its collection. A third "mechanized allegory" completes the group of "these strange pictorial inventions in which theology and technology celebrate their unlikely marriage" and depict Eucharistic themes. This is the fountain, which may be shown running with the blood of Christ; a metaphor more in line with the daily life of urban people.

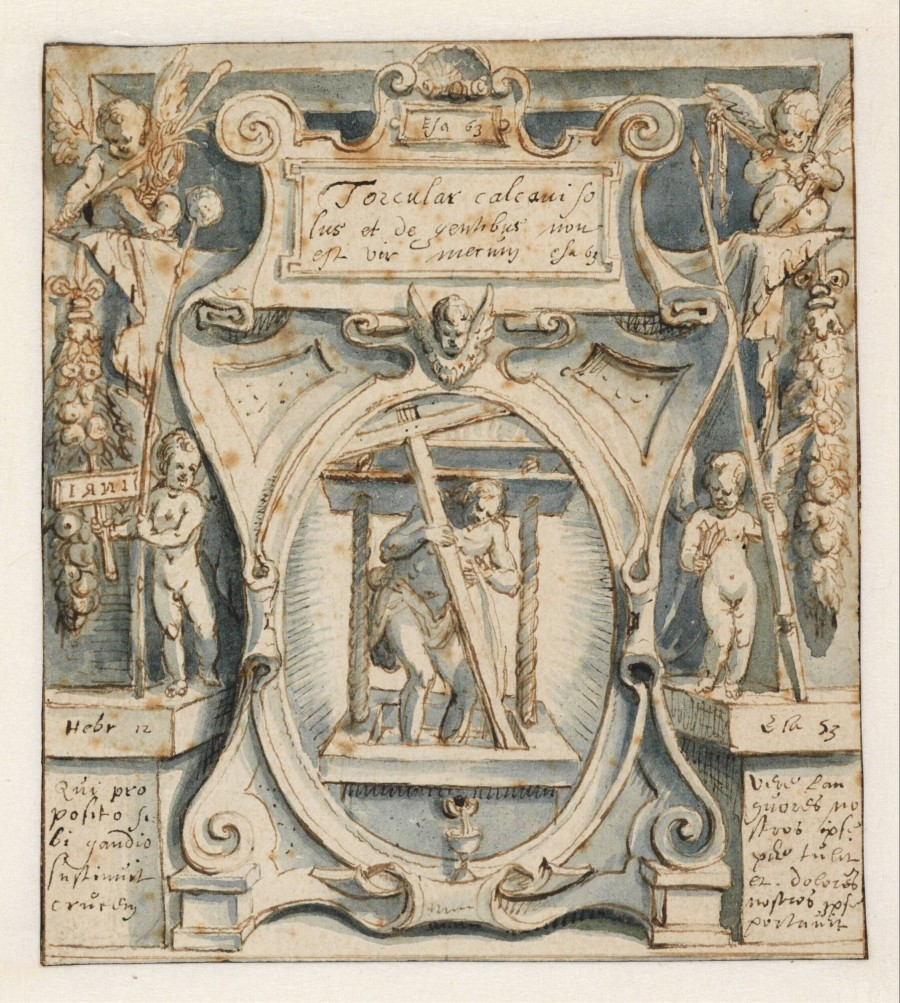
Preparatory drawing for a print, by the Dutch Calvinist Karel van Mander, 1596. The cross is nearly erect, in the "triumphal" position typical of Protestant versions

The image survived the Protestant Reformation and, despite some Catholic disapproval in the Counter-Reformation, "persisted into the eighteenth century in the art of both confessions. Whereas the Catholic image gave greater prominence to the doctrine of the sacrament, the Protestant stressed Christ's obedient sacrifice". For example, the Dutch Protestant artist Karel van Mander, in his drawn design of 1596 for a print, shows Christ under a large rectangular winepress plate in the usual fashion, but with a cross carried nearly upright on his shoulder "in triumph". Van Mander incorporated three short Biblical quotations in the decorative framework; as well as Isaiah 63:3 above, there are below "For the joy set before him he endured the cross, scorning its shame" (Hebrews 12:2) opposite "Surely he took up our pain and bore our suffering" (Isaiah 53:4).

A 17th-century German development expanded the image into a wider allegory of "God's work of Redemption in his church", placing Christ in the winepress on a hill at the top of an image in vertical format, with his juice-blood running down or sprinkling groups of the redeemed standing to each side, which may include donor portraits, Adam and Eve, saints, prophets, kings and prelates. This is seen in the frontispiece to a Protestant Bible of 1641, printed in Nuremberg, which has room for a multitude of the ordinary faithful above the major figures in the foreground. As in many images from the 16th-century onwards, Christ carries the "pennon of the Resurrection" (red cross on white) and here uses the end of the shaft to stab a dragon representing Satan, showing the increasing Protestant emphasis on the Winetreader as conqueror of his enemies, from Isaiah 63. Similar images decorate some German funerary monuments.

== Scriptural and patristic background ==
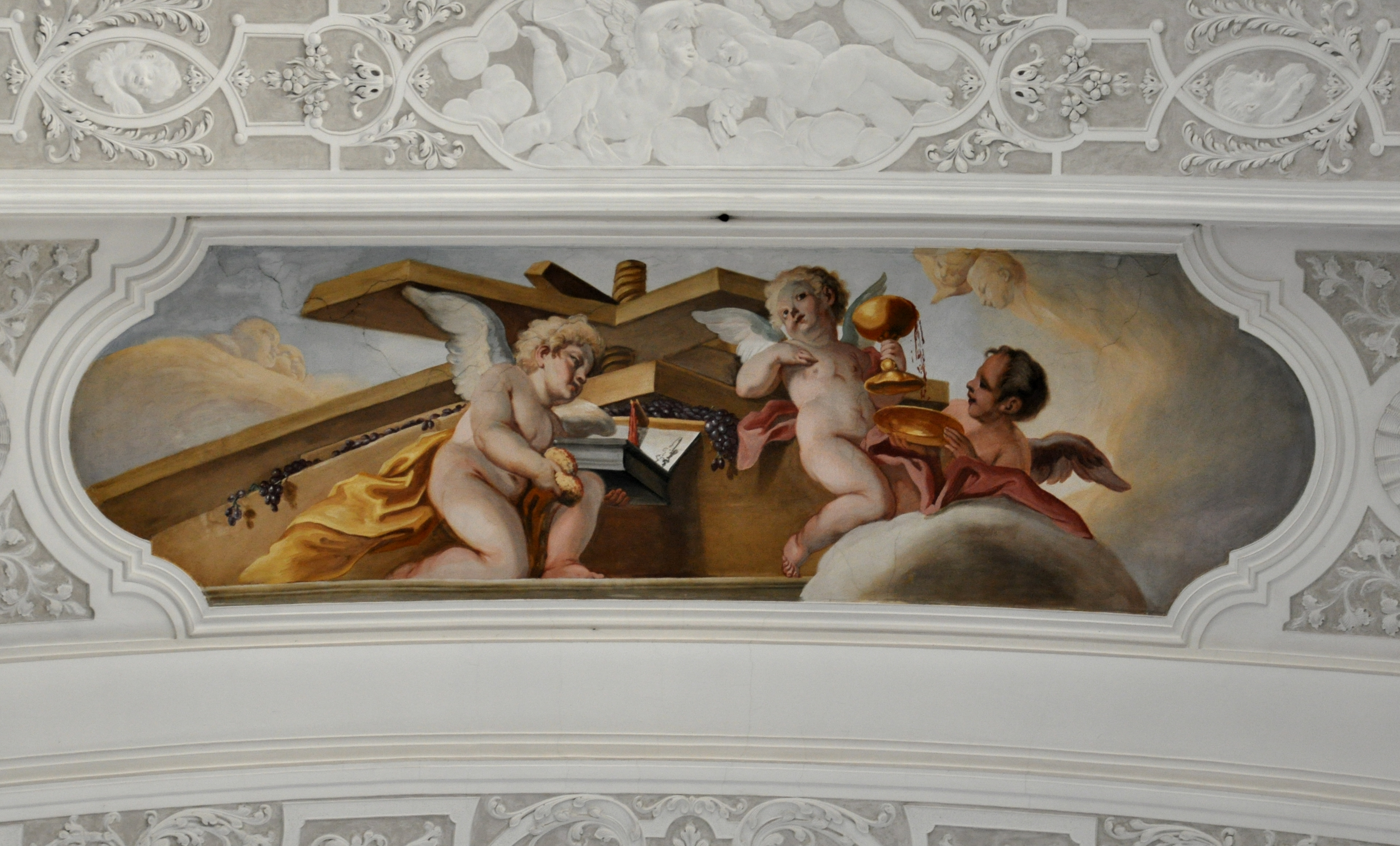
A depiction by Cosmas Damian Asam (1718–1720) omits the figure of Christ

Numerous texts were used in support and elucidation of the motif. The key scriptural passage was Isaiah 63:3, taken as spoken by Christ, says "I have trodden the winepress alone", and wine-stained clothes are mentioned. This passage was closely echoed in Revelation 19:15: "He treads the winepress of the fury of the wrath of God Almighty", and the clothes are also soaked, this time with blood. Revelation 14:19–20 says:

And the angel thrust in his sickle into the earth, and gathered the vine of the earth, and cast it into the great winepress of the wrath of God. And the winepress was trodden without the city, and blood came out of the winepress, even unto the horse bridles, by the space of a thousand and six hundred furlongs."

In Genesis 49:10–11, Jacob tells his sons:

The sceptre will not depart from Judah, nor the ruler's staff from between his feet, until he to whom it belongs shall come and the obedience of the nations shall be his.

He will tether his donkey to a vine, his colt to the choicest branch; he will wash his garments in wine, his robes in the blood of grapes.

The idea of Christ as both the treader and the trodden wine is found in Saint Gregory the Great: "He has trodden the winepress alone in which he was himself pressed, for with his own strength he patiently overcame suffering". It is also found in typology: in Numbers 13:23, the "spies" who came back from the Promised Land with a bunch of grapes carried on a pole resting on their shoulders were also used as a type prefiguring the antitype of the Crucifixion; following Justin Martyr and Augustine the pole was understood as the cross, the grapes as Christ, and the two bearers as Ecclesia and Synagoga. The Klosterneuburg Altar, made in 1181 by Nicholas of Verdun, includes the scene with this meaning.

Another biblical theme linked to the winepress discussed by commentators was the allegory of the "Vineyard of God" or "True Vine", found in Isaiah 27:2–5, John 15:1 and Matthew 21:33–45, understood as a metaphor for the church. All these elements came together in the image of Christ in the winepress.

== Relation to actual technology ==
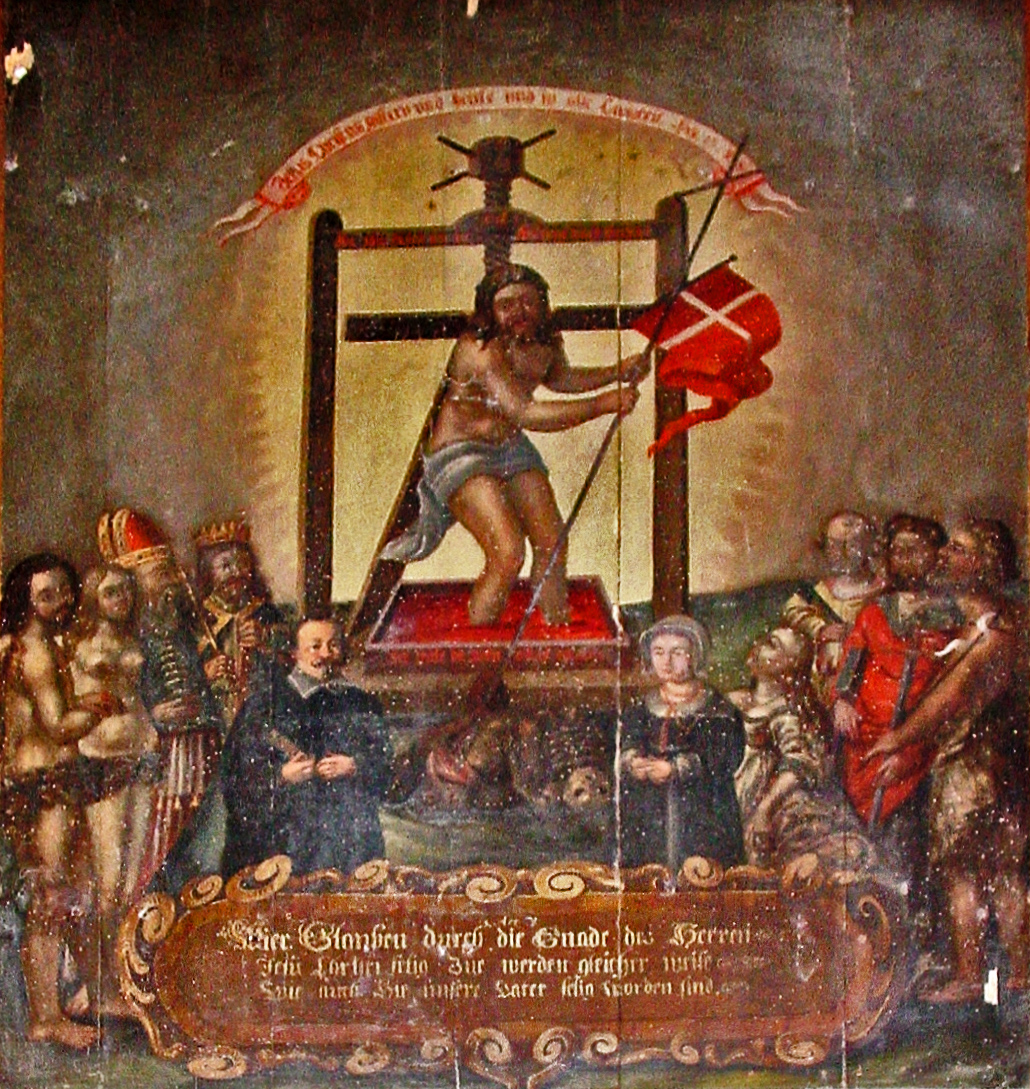
German memorial of 1649, with the allegory of Christ redeeming his Church. The press is relatively realistic, with a central screw, but the cross replaces a plate pressing on Christ.

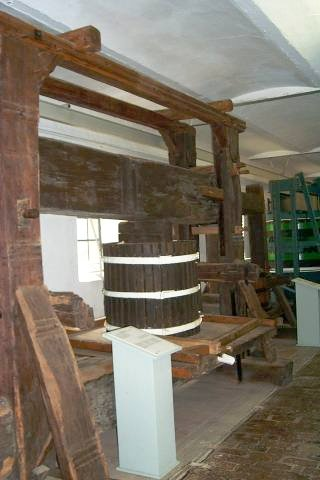
German winepress set up to press, though screw is out of picture. Note how shallow the rectangular collecting-floor is.

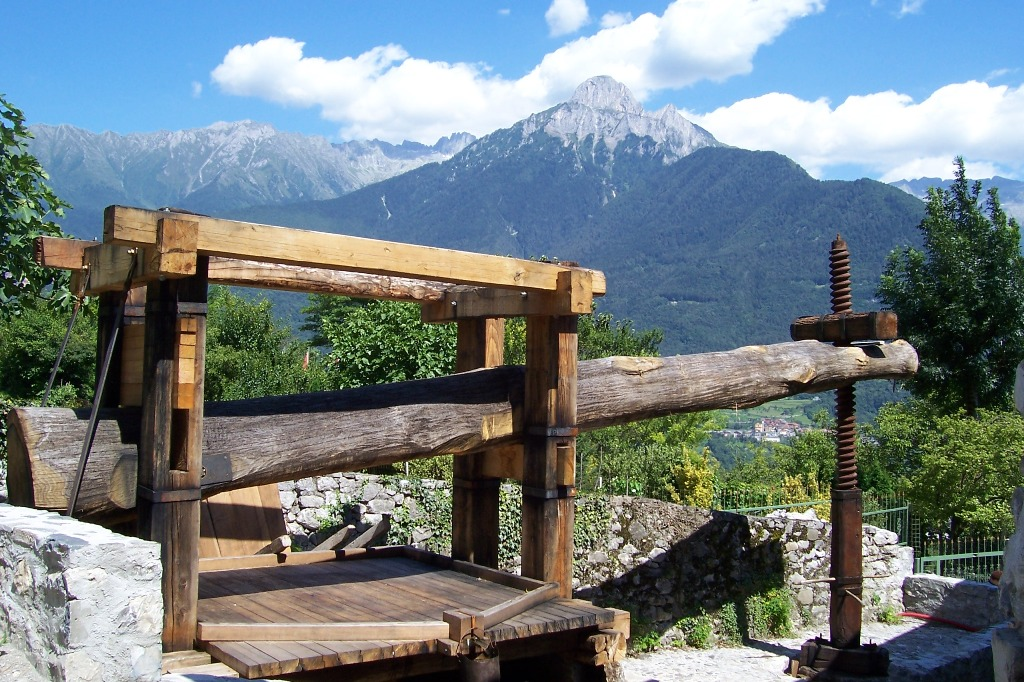
Italian beam-type press. Note the small turning-handles near the base of the screw.

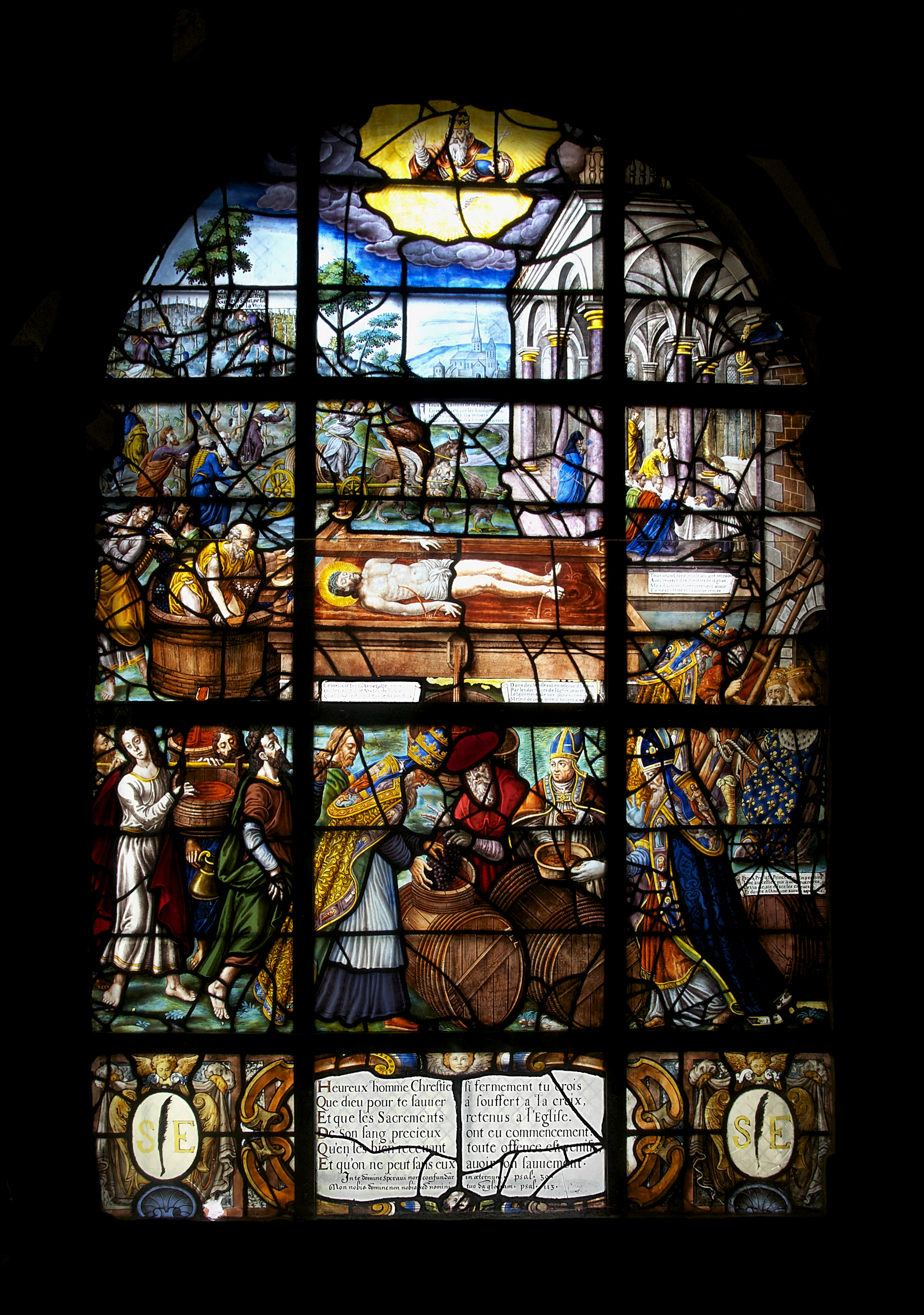
Renaissance stained-glass window at Saint-Étienne-du-Mont in Paris, with an unusual form of press, and St Peter treading a circular tub to the left.

The typical image from the late-medieval period onwards sacrifices a realistic treatment of winepress technology for the needs of an immediately recognisable visual metaphor, and one including a human figure in an unnatural place in the centre of the composition. The place where Christ stands in most compositions would in reality be occupied by various pieces of the mechanism, in particular a plate or disk to press on the grapes, which would be in a smaller circular wooden "basket" like a straight-sided barrel, but with gaps between the staves to allow the juice to escape, and various bulky weights and spacing blocks of wood to transmit the pressure from the beam down to the plate. Christ is nearly always shown standing in a shallow rectangular framework, which is realistic, but this is for collecting the juice flowing out of the barrel-like basket containing the grapes and is not in reality where grapes are placed, as the images always show. A vat or floor designed for real treading by foot would be much deeper and more typically circular.

Although several of the biblical passages the image draws upon emphasize juice-stained clothing and "treading" by foot, by using a mechanical winepress the need for workers to tread the grapes with their feet in an open vat was removed. It seems unlikely that a mechanical winepress was actually meant by any of the various biblical texts, although mechanisms are described by Roman authors, the detailed operation of which remains unclear. The image in art emphasizes Christ's role as what is trodden rather than as a treader but also retains his role as treader, though such red staining as is shown is usually from blood rather than juice. In the early typological image at Comburg there is already conflation between the method of pressing just using the feet of farm-workers in an open vat, and the mechanical basket press, which uses a heavy beam controlled by a large wooden screw, bearing down on a plate pressing the grapes. The other end of the beam from the screw is held in a wooden framework, which is often shown, but the essential handles for turning the screw are less often seen. Sometimes they are shown with a small hovering half-length God the Father doing the turning. However, in reality the bottom of the screw would either press on the centre of a plate in a relatively small frame, "basket" or barrel containing the grapes (as illustrated at right), or in the more common type with the screw at the end of the beam, the bottom of the screw would sit in a fixed socket on the ground. In the images, the bottom of the screw often goes uselessly into the side of the open pressing floor.

With a large rectangular pressing-floor, the screw might be located centrally with framework on both sides. Either a large plate underneath the screw would press down on grapes placed in the rectangular floor, or a smaller one on grapes in a circular barrel-like basket sitting on the floor, the juice usually flowing out onto the floor and being collected from a discharge point in that. Both the real presses shown below are of this latter type. As the general standard of artistic depictions of complicated mechanisms improved in the Renaissance, with a fuller understanding of graphical perspective, some images after about 1500 show more realistic large plates pressing down on Christ, still a difficult depiction for the artist to represent.

== In English poetry ==
Christ in the winepress appears in the 14th century poetry of English Benedictine John Lydgate, and the metaphor is used by two important English 17th-century poets. One of the best known poems of the Anglican Vicar George Herbert is The Agonie, included in The Temple (1633), where the second stanza (of three) is an extended conceit on the metaphor in its Man of Sorrows form, followed by the third on the Eucharist:

Who would know Sinne, let him repair

Unto mount Olivet; there shall he see
A man so wrung with pains, that all his hair,

His skinne, his garments bloudie be.

Sinne is that presse and vice, which forceth pain
To hunt his cruell food through ev'ry vein.

Who knows not Love, let him assay

And taste that juice, which on the crosse a pike
Did set again abroach; then let him say

If ever he did taste the like.

Love is that liquour sweet and most divine,
Which my God feels as bloud; but I, as wine.

John Milton uses the metaphor in an extended simile to describe Satan harassing Christ in Paradise Regained (1671, Book IV, lines 5–17). Satan is:

[...] as a swarm of flies in vintage time,
About the wine-press where sweet moust is powrd,
[which,] Beat off, returns as oft with humming sound.

== In German Baroque music ==
The motif of Christ coming in judgement as treader of the winepress is found in the lyrics of German Protestant baroque cantatas in the 18th century. The apocalyptic biblical motif of Christ treading the grapes in the winepress (e.g. Revelation 19:15, where Christ returns as the victor treading his enemies) is traditionally connected in Protestant exposition with a Messianic interpretation of Old Testament passages such as "Who is this that comes from Edom, in crimsoned garments from Bozrah" (Isaiah 63:1–3). Johann Sebastian Bach sets in his cantata Gott fähret auf mit Jauchzen, BWV 43, the text by an anonymous author that reflects in movements 6 and 7 this theme combined with the traditional one of Christ as the grapes, with his music reflecting the text:

No. 7, Aria for bass

Er ists, der ganz allein
Die Kelter hat getreten
Voll Schmerzen, Qual und Pein,
Verlorne zu erretten
Durch einen teuren Kauf.
Ihr Thronen, mühet euch
Und setzt ihm Kränze auf!
It is He, who completely alone
has trod upon the winepress
full of sorrow, torment and pain,
to save the lost ones
through a precious purchase.
You Thrones, stir yourselves,
and set a wreath upon Him!

Other examples are Der Blutrünstige Kelter-Treter und von der Erden erhöhete Menschen-Sohn (The Bloodthirsty Treader of the Winepress and the Son of Man exalted by the Earth, 1721) of Johann Mattheson and the "Keltertreter" St Luke Passion of Homilius.

== In Battle Hymn of the Republic ==
The first verse of the 1861 song "Battle Hymn of the Republic" states:

Mine eyes have seen the glory of the coming of the Lord;
He is trampling out the vintage where the grapes of wrath are stored;
He hath loosed the fateful lightning of His terrible swift sword:
His truth is marching on.

The passage reflects Isaiah 63, Revelation 19, and other passages feeding the "winepress" tradition and was reflected in the title of John Steinbeck's 1939 novel The Grapes of Wrath.
