= The Third Eye (serial) =

1920 film

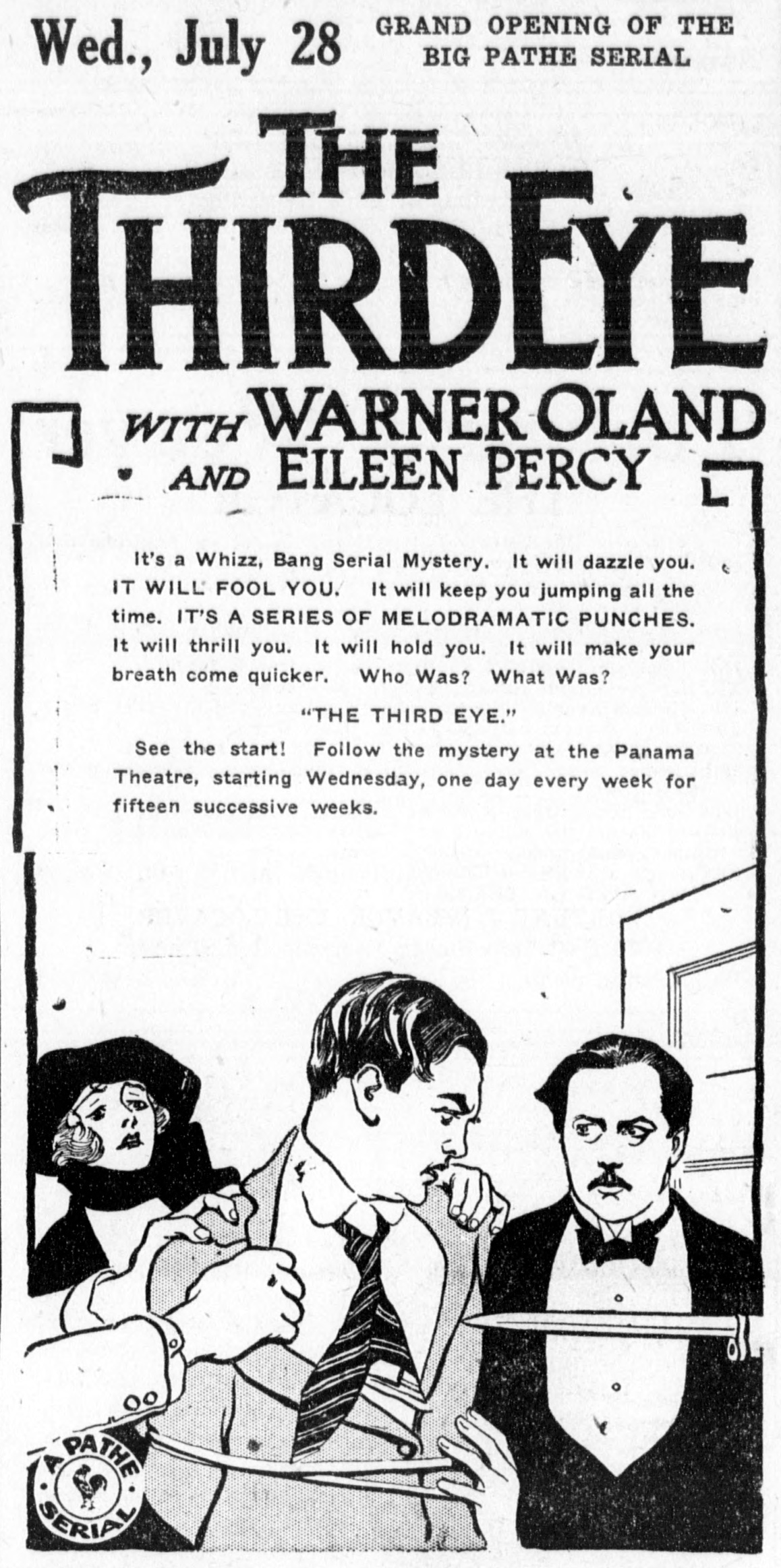
- Newspaper advertisement.
- Directed by: James W. Horne
- Written by: H. H. Van Loan
- Starring: Warner Oland; Eileen Percy
- Production company: Astra Films
- Distributed by: Pathé Exchange
- Release date: May 23, 1920
- Running time: 15 episodes
- Country: United States
- Language: Silent (English intertitles)

The Third Eye is a 1920 American crime mystery drama film serial directed by James W. Horne. The film is considered to be lost.

== Plot ==
As described in a film publication, Curtis Steele (Oland), a society man at a film studio, has been pursuing actress Rita Moreland (Percy) and confronts her at the studio with the intention of having sex with her. She repulses him and during the struggle shoots him. Steele staggers forward and collapses. She is terrified as she thought that the revolver had been loaded with blanks. As she bends over him, he leaps to his feet and with a sneering remark leaves. Later that night Rita is informed that Steele was found at the studio shot through the heart, and that there is a film showing Steel chasing her and then her shooting him. The serial then develops around Rita, her sweetheart, a villain, and the mystery of who killed Steele, who made the film, and attempts to obtain the film.

== Cast ==
- Warner Oland as Curtis Steele / Malcolm Graw
- Eileen Percy as Rita Moreland
- Jack Mower as Dick Keene
- Olga Grey as Zaida Savoy
- Mark Strong as Detective Gale

== Chapter titles ==
1. The Poisoned Dagger
2. The Pendulum of Death
3. In Destruction's Path
4. Daggers of Death
5. The Black Hand Bag
6. The Death Spark
7. The Crook's Ranch
8. Trails of Danger
9. The Race for Life
10. The House of Terrors
11. The Long Arm of Vengeance
12. Man Against Man
13. Blind Trails of Justice
14. At Bay
15. Triumph of Justice

== See also ==
- List of film serials
- List of film serials by studio
