= Justice Rector =

Justice Rector may refer to:

- Henry Massey Rector (1816–1899), associate justice of the Kansas Supreme Court
- James Ward Rector (1903–1979), associate justice of the Wisconsin Supreme Court
