= Joan Sawyer (dancer) =

American society dancer, composer, suffragist and businesswoman (1887–1966)

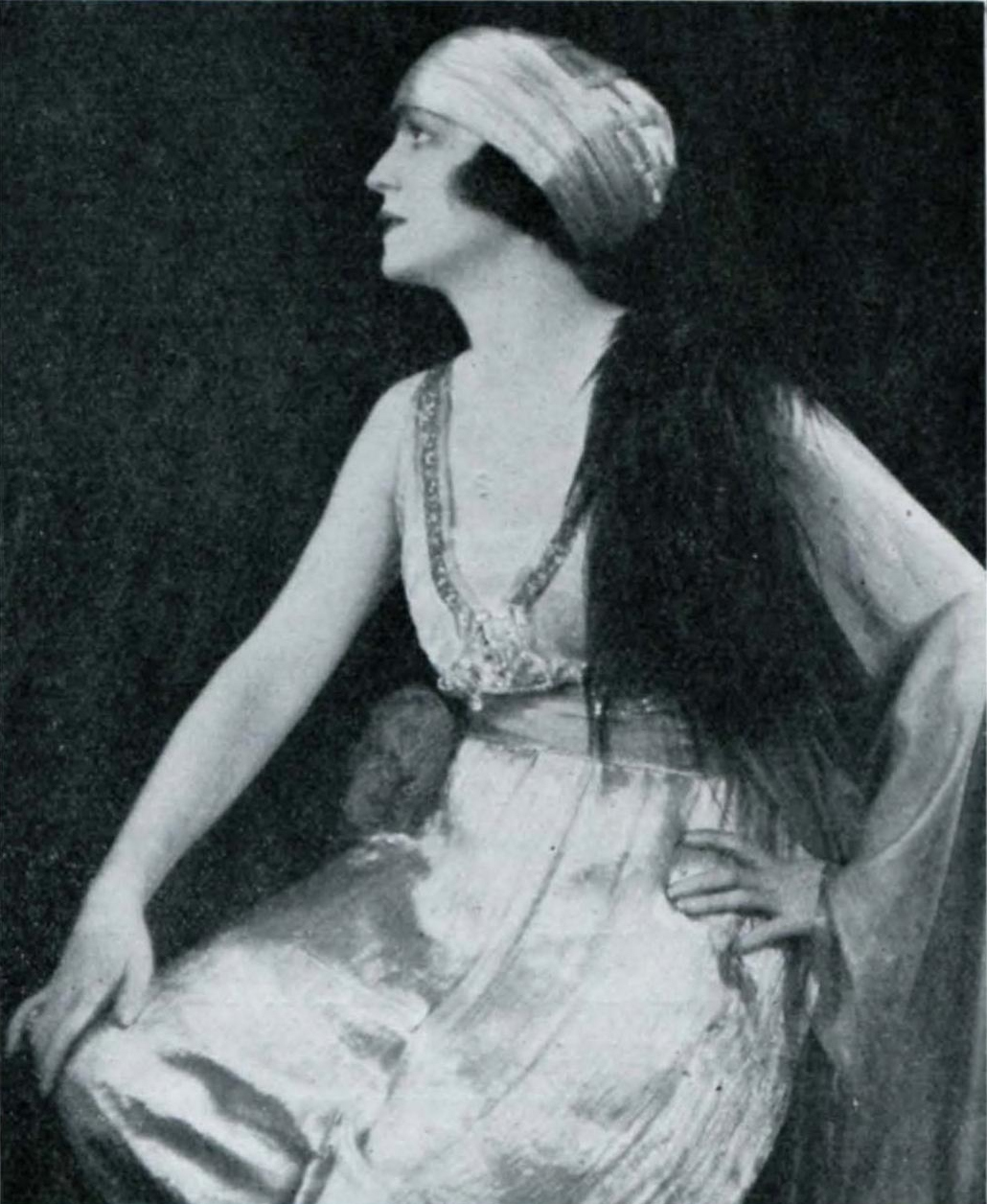
- Born: Bessie Josephine Morrison; 1887; El Paso, Texas
- Died: November 1966 (aged 78–79); Dade County, Florida
- Occupation: dancer

Joan Sawyer (October 11, 1887 – November 1966), born Bessie Josephine Morrison, was an American society dancer, composer, suffragist, and businesswoman, who performed on the vaudeville circuit in the 1910s. Among her dance partners was a young Rudolph Valentino.

== Early life ==
Bessie Josephine Morrison was born in El Paso, Texas. She lived in Ohio as a young woman, trained as a stenographer before finding a career in dance.

== Career ==
Joan Sawyer was a professional social dancer, demonstrating the newest ballroom steps at private parties and in nightclubs as an example for other dancers. Sawyer was a feminist social dancer, who believed her work advanced the cause of women's suffrage. "It seems evident that the spread of the dancing habit has done much for women," she told an interviewer, "for dancing is the best form of exercise, for both the body and the mind." Also for the suffrage cause, she drove an automobile decorated with suffrage banners across the United States in 1915, stopping along the way to give impromptu dance shows to raise funds for the suffrage movement.

A reviewer in 1915 called Sawyer "as graceful as a summer cloud adrift in a sea of blue." Among her dance partners were Rudolph Valentino, George Raft, Nigel Barrie, Wallace McCutcheon Jr., and Arthur Ashley. She danced with Valentino for president Woodrow Wilson. She was among the dancers who claimed to invent the foxtrot.

She managed a nightclub, the Persian Garden, in New York City in 1914. The club was unusual in its time, for having a woman manager and a black Jamaican-born band leader, Dan Kildare. She was also the namesake of the "Joan Waltz", she composed a tango ("The Persian Garden Tango") and a maxixe ("The Joan Sawyer Maxixe"), she originated the "Aeroplane Waltz", and she published instructions for other dance steps. She performed in vaudeville, and appeared in one silent film, Love's Law (1917).

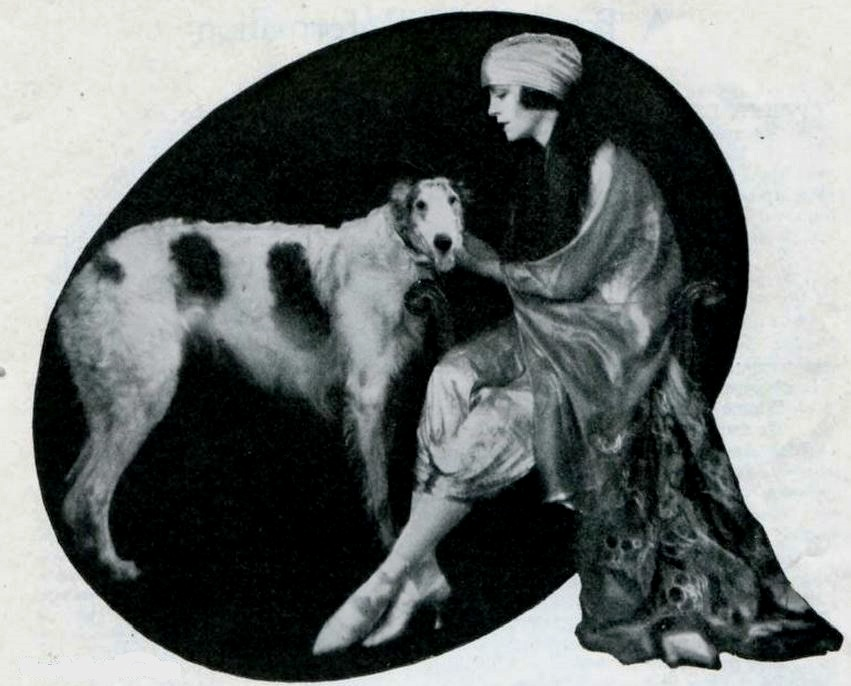
Joan Sawyer and a dog, from a 1921 publication.

== Personal life ==
Bessie Morrison married briefly in her teens, to Alvah Sawyer. She kept his surname as part of her professional name. In 1917 Sawyer was named as a co-respondent in the highly publicized divorce of heiress Blanca Errázuriz and businessman Jack de Saulles; later that year, Errázuriz killed de Saulles in a custody dispute. She married again to businessman George A. Rentschler, in 1922. In 1929, Joan Sawyer Rentschler was sued by an Ohio man, who claimed she persuaded his wife to divorce him. She divorced Rentschler in 1936; she married and divorced her third husband, writer Jed Kiley, in 1944. She died in 1966, aged 79 years, in Florida.
