= The Girl at Home =

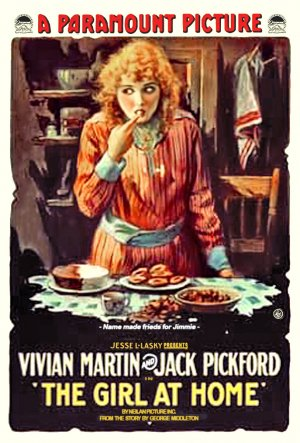
- Theatrical release poster
- Directed by: Marshall Neilan
- Screenplay by: Beulah Marie Dix; George Middleton
- Produced by: Jesse L. Lasky
- Starring: Vivian Martin; Jack Pickford; James Neill; Olga Grey; Edythe Chapman; William Elmer
- Cinematography: Walter Stradling
- Production company: Jesse L. Lasky Feature Play Company
- Distributed by: Paramount Pictures
- Release date: April 26, 1917
- Running time: 50 minutes
- Country: United States
- Language: English

The Girl at Home is a 1917 American drama silent film directed by Marshall Neilan and written by Beulah Marie Dix and George Middleton. The film stars Vivian Martin, Jack Pickford, James Neill, Olga Grey, Edythe Chapman and William Elmer. The film was released on April 26, 1917, by Paramount Pictures.

== Cast ==
- Vivian Martin as Jean Hilton
- Jack Pickford as Jimmie Dexter
- James Neill as Squire Padgate
- Olga Grey as Diana Parish
- Edythe Chapman as Mary Dexter
- William Elmer as Detective Hagen

== Preservation status ==
- The film is preserved in the Library of Congress collection.
