= John Rector =

John Rector may refer to:

- John B. Rector, American federal judge
- John Rector (writer), American short story writer and novelist
