= Rector Street =

Rector Street may refer to:

- These New York City Subway stations in Manhattan:
  - Rector Street (IRT Broadway–Seventh Avenue Line), serving the 1 train
  - Rector Street (BMT Broadway Line), serving the N, R, and W trains
- These demolished New York City elevated stations in Manhattan:
  - Rector Street (IRT Sixth Avenue Line), former elevated station, now demolished
  - Rector Street (IRT Ninth Avenue Line), former elevated station, now demolished
