= Augustus Carney =

American actor (1870–1920)

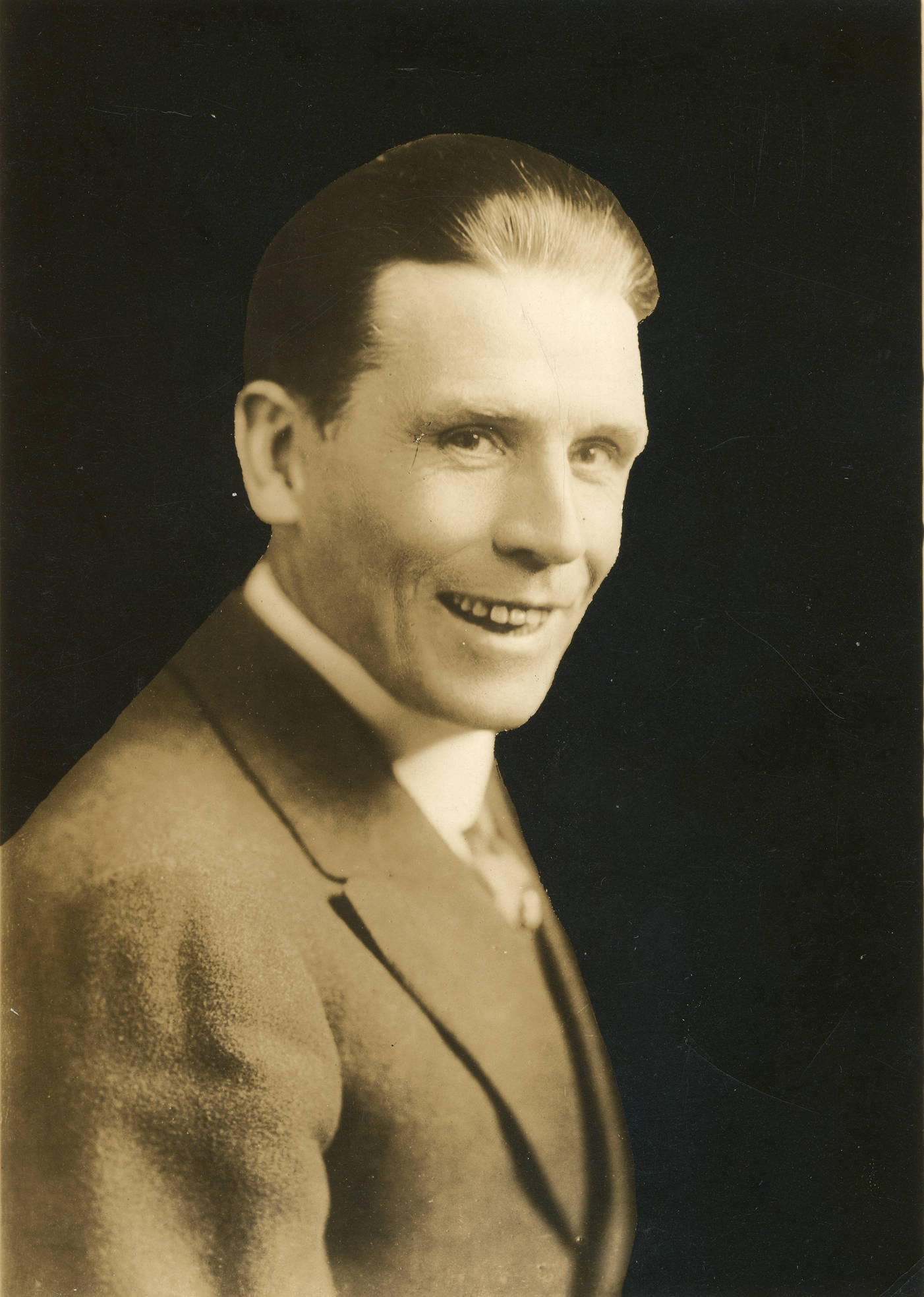
- Carney in 1913
- Born: 1870; Ireland
- Died: 1920 (aged 49–50)
- Occupation: Actor
- Years active: ca. 1900–16

Augustus Carney (1870–1920) was an American actor during the early 20th century. Born in Ireland in 1870, he got his start in vaudeville before entering the film industry. In his short seven-year career he appeared in over 130 films, mostly shorts.

== Life and career ==
He began in vaudeville and entered films in 1909 with a featured role in a Ben Turpin comedy short, Tag Day. He had been discovered by Broncho Billy Anderson, one of the founders of Essanay Studios, and was soon starring in comedy shorts for the studio. Beginning in 1910, he co-starred with Victor Potel in a series of shorts as the characters Hank and Lank (played by Carney and Potel, respectively). The series lasted for two years, after which Carney developed the character of "Alkali Ike." The character starred in its own series of shorts, such as 1911's Alkali Ike's Auto (which is still extant), and which co-starred Harry Todd. He was also in many of the popular episodes of the series of film shorts featuring "Broncho Billy", which were directed by and starred Anderson. He also appeared in the Broncho Billy series as other characters, such as Doctor A. Carney in 1911's Broncho Billy's Adventure, and as a cowboy in 1911's Broncho Billy's Christmas Dinner. The Alkali Ike series became so popular that Essanay began merchandising Ike action figures. While the series was running, Carney starred in other shorts for Essanay, such as Hubby's Scheme (1911), 1911's A Hungry Pair (again co-starring Potel), The Bandit's Child (1912 - which also starred Anderson and Todd), and Hypnotism in Hicksville (1913). His last appearance as Alkali Ike was released in January 1914, The Awakening at Snakeville. When he asked for a higher salary and was refused, Carney left Essanay and went to work at Universal Film Manufacturing Company (now known as Universal Studios). There he created the character of "Universal Ike," which was identical to Alkali Ike, but that name was owned by Essanay. He made 16 films for Universal based on this character in 1914; however, his requests for additional pay led to his being fired by Universal that same year. After his departure from Universal, he made several more shorts at various studios and appeared in only four feature films in 1915–16. Three of those features, The Absentee (1915), The Failure (1915), and Martyrs of the Alamo (1915), were directed by Christy Cabanne. His final film appearance was in a supporting role in 1916's Blue Blood and Red, which was directed by Raoul Walsh.

Carney left the film industry in 1916 and died four years later in 1920 at the age of 50.

== Partial filmography ==
- Alkali Ike's Auto (1911)
- The Awakening at Snakeville (1914)
- The Absentee (1915)
- The Failure (1915)
- Martyrs of the Alamo (1915)
- Blue Blood and Red (1916)
