= Josephine Rector =

American screenwriter (1885–1958)

- Born: Josephine Pickel; September 25, 1885; Indiana, United States
- Died: October 1, 1958 (aged 73); Castro Valley, United States
- Occupation(s): Film Actress, Screenwriter, Chief Scenario Writer, Scenario Editor, Scenario Writer
- Years active: 1911–1914

Josephine Rector (September 25, 1885, in Indiana – October 1, 1958, in Castro Valley) was an American scriptwriter and actress. Working for the Essanay company based in Oakland, Rector had a short career in the silent film period of cinema, with all her known films released from between 1911 and 1914 for the Essanay company. She is sometimes also referred to as Mrs. Hal Angus, after her second husband, Hal Angus, whom she married after leaving Essanay in 1914.

She entered the film industry after discussing story ideas with the actor Jack O'Brien. She sold her first scripts to Essanay when it was located in Los Gatos in 1910–1911. She has also worked with George Kirke Spoor, distributor of screen equipment and Gilbert M. Anderson, or "Broncho Billy" Anderson, an actor, director and producer, who is the cowboy star in most of the films she worked in. Ultimately, Rector decided not to move to Hollywood, which became the centre of the film industry, and ran a flower shop in Hayward, California in later life. Most of her films are now lost, and none of her original scripts are known to survive.

== Early life ==
Rector, born as Josephine Pickel, grew up in Montana where her father was a miner. She had no problem with Western culture since she was used to riding horses, and outdoor activities. In the 1890s, Josephine used to follow her father, a miner, over the Chilkoot Pass to retrieve some gold in the waters of the Yukon. This lifestyle helped her with her acting, later on, in the Essanay Company, who specialized in Western-style films.

== Career ==
Josephine Rector started working with Essanay before they moved their second office in Niles. She later met Jack O'Brien, Anderson's secretary, around the beginning of 1911, in Los Gatos, California. She wrote her first film, Across the Plains, in 1911. Rector discussed her ideas of writing to O'Brien, who encouraged her to send them to Hayward Daily Review's account. Not long after that, her colleague Anderson, and company, left San Francisco, while Josephine stayed to live with both her sons. Gilbert M. Anderson was a difficult individual to work with on set and when he asked Rector to come to San Francisco, she replied: "No, I’ve had enough of you". When her oldest son died around that time, she was rehired seven months later by the same crew, who moved back to San Rafael for work. Anderson realized how valuable Josephine's work is to the company and asked her: "Send all the stories you have and also let me know how your account stands… I appreciate your work and realize you are a great help to us".

On April 1, 1912, they set up camp near the Wesley Hotel where they would film. She then worked with them one more time in San Rafael and became the head of the scenario department, in April 1912, in Niles, where she also acted in a couple of parts. She started working with them for fifteen dollars a week and would sometimes be in front of the camera too. Rector would make sure Essanay was ready with all the scripts needed. She had her own office in the Essanay studio, located in Niles, where she writes her scripts. Josephine left the Essanay organization in April 1914.

In May 1914, after marrying Hal Angus, a fellow actor, they worked for the Pacific Motion Picture Company, a company in which they created in order to make films. Unfortunately, it was not successful. In 1915, she worked for the Yolo Film Company. Later on, she ran a flower shop until 1926 with Hal, in Hayward, California and after that, she became a housewife.

== Interviews ==
Several months before she died, Rector confirmed, in an interview, that she equally liked acting as much as writing and was remembering the times when there were no doubles.

In an Oakland Tribune interview, a few decades later, Josephine Rector reveals that some of the best scripts were inspired by pulp magazines from the Oakland Public Library. The Dance at Eagle Pass (1913), one of Rector's greatest work, refers to one of these magazines.

== Filmography ==
=== Short films ===
Year	Film	Job
1911	Across the Plains	Writer (Scenario)
1911	Broncho Billy's Christmas Dinner	Actress
1912	Broncho Billy's Bible	Actress
1912	Love on Tough Luck Ranch	Actress
1912	The Dance at Silver Gulch	Actress
1912	Western Girls	Actress
1913	The Last Shot	Writer (Scenario)
1913	The Cowboy Samaritan	Writer
1913	Broncho Billy and the Sheriff's Kid	Actress
1913	Broncho Billy's Reason	Actress and scenario
1913	Alkali Ike and the Hypnotist	Actress
1913	The Two Ranchmen	Actress
1913	The Dance at Eagle Pass	Actress, Writer (Scenario)
1913	Hard Luck Bill	Actress
1913	A Romance of the Hills	Actress
1913	Broncho Billy's Squareness	Actress
1913	Broncho Billy's Christmas Deed	Actress
1913	That Pair from Thespia	Actress
1914	The Cast of the Die	Actress
1914	A Gambler's Way	Actress
1914	Snakeville's Home Guard	Actress
1914	Broncho Billy's Sermon	Actress
1914	The Atonement	Actress
1914	Sophie's Birthday Party	Actress
1914	Snakeville's Fire Brigade	Actress
1914	The Weaker's Strength	Actress
